= Timeline of the Adriatic campaign of 1807–1814 =

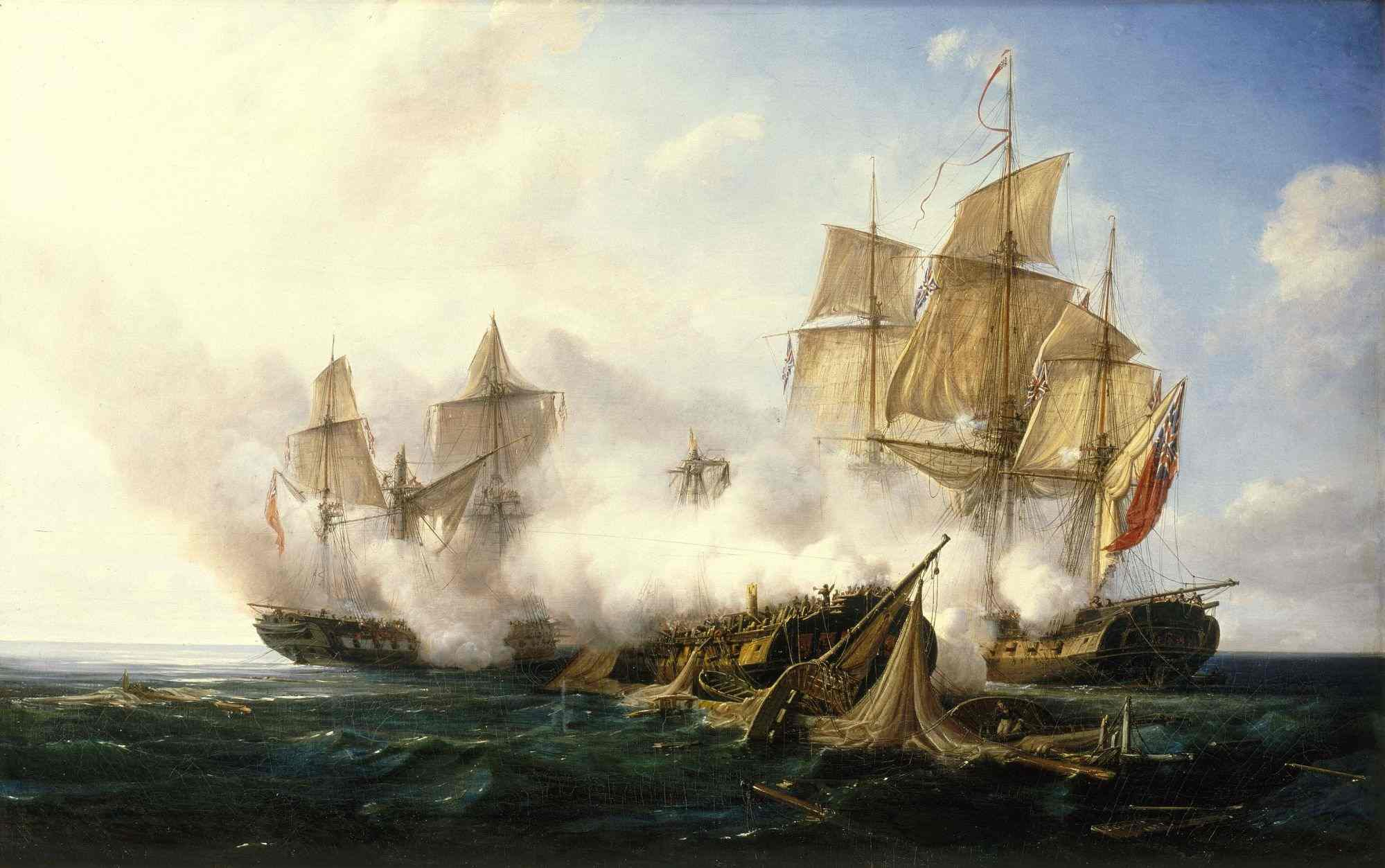
La Pomone contre les fregates Alceste et Active, painted by Pierre-Julien Gilbert.

The Adriatic campaign of 1807–1814 was a struggle for supremacy in the Adriatic Sea between the French Navy and the British Royal Navy during the Napoleonic Wars. The early stages of the campaign saw extensive activity between rival frigate squadrons, climaxing at the Battle of Lissa in 1811 at which the last major French force was destroyed and its commander killed. The subsequent campaign was characterised by sustained raids by British warships on French and Italian convoys, warships and coastal positions across the Adriatic, culminating in the capture of several key French port cities in 1813, during the War of the Sixth Coalition.

The campaign developed following the Treaty of Tilsit in 1807, in which the Russian Navy agreed to withdraw from the Adriatic. For the next seven years, the Royal Navy sought to disrupt French and Italian military and commercial sea traffic, as well as the movement of troops and supplies to the Illyrian Provinces. Command of the Adriatic partially rested on control of the Ionian Islands, which lie outside the Straits of Otranto but could be used to blockade the passage if properly garrisoned. To this end, the French heavily fortified the island of Corfu, but were unable to consistently maintain an effective naval squadron to dispute British operations in the Adriatic. Exploiting French weakness at sea, British cruisers were able to defeat successive French squadrons sent to reinforce the region and exerted total dominance in the Adriatic and Ionian seas.

The campaign in the Adriatic has been credited with having a significant effect on the wider war through the disruption of French forces in the Balkans. It has been suggested that Napoleon intended to invade the Ottoman Empire following the War of the Fifth Coalition, but was dissuaded in part due to the difficulty of supplying a force in the region without control of the Adriatic, his attention eventually turning to Russia. The campaign also had effects on the morale and effectiveness of the French fleet, which lost some of its best commanders and frigates in the campaign, and on the Austrian advance on Italy in 1813, when French defence lines were repeatedly out-flanked by British attacks from the sea.

== Timeline ==
The list on the left recounts the actions and operations undertaken by the squadrons operating in the Adriatic during the campaign. The list on the right provides contextual information, recounting wider events in Europe and the Mediterranean that may have had an effect on the campaign.

Year	Adriatic	Napoleonic Wars
1807	23 August, British brig HMS Weasel arrived off Corfu to liaise with the Russian garrison. As Weasel's boats approached the harbour, a Russian boat met them and informed the British captain that a French Army garrison had taken possession of the island. The following day, Weasel's crew spotted three small ships approaching Corfu and chased them onto rocks off the island where they were wrecked. Three other vessels were spotted minutes later and Weasel pursued them too, capturing them and the 250 French soldiers aboard. Later that afternoon, a French dispatch vessel was also taken and burnt before Weasel returned to Malta with news of the French seizure of the Ionian Islands.; 7 October, British sixth rate HMS Porcupine under Captain Henry Duncan, chased the Italian gunboat Safo into Zupiano on Giuppana (Šipan). In the evening, boats from Porcupine entered the harbour and seized the gunboat and a smaller vessel despatched to protect it.; 25 October, boats from HMS Herald attacked and captured the French privateer César from an anchorage under the fortress at Otranto.; 27–29 November, HMS Porcupine began a series of raids along the Dalmatian Coast near Ragusa (Dubrovnik). Her cutter entered Ragusa harbour itself, seizing two coastal vessels. Two days later, the cutter attacked the harbour of Zuliano, burning most of the vessels in the port, destroying French military supplies and capturing two coastal merchant vessels. One of the captured ships was carrying four large mortars and a wide selection of artillery supplies for the port's defences.	19 February, Admiral John Thomas Duckworth entered the Dardanelles in an effort to reach Constantinople and destroy the Ottoman fleet. After two weeks of fighting the British squadron was forced to withdraw without causing significant damage to the Turks and having suffered heavy casualties. This action was the beginning of the Anglo-Turkish War, which continued in the Eastern Mediterranean until January 1809 and included a large scale amphibious operation at Alexandria and a number of actions between frigates and smaller ships.; 9 and 12 July, Emperor Napoleon of France and Tsar Alexander I of Russia signed the Treaty of Tilsit following the French victory at the Battle of Friedland. The treaty primarily focused on the breakup of Prussia into a series of French-administered client states, but minor clauses provided for Russian evacuation and French control of the Septinsular Republic, a series of Ionian Islands that dominated the entrance of the French-held Adriatic Sea.; 1 December, following the Treaty of Fontainebleau, signed in October 1807, French and Spanish armies invaded Portugal and forced the Portuguese royal family to flee to Brazil two days before the fall of Lisbon. This campaign marked the start of the Peninsular War. During the year, British ships had repeatedly raided the Spanish Mediterranean coast, capturing convoys, destroying batteries and attacking Spanish warships.
1808	23 February, the French Toulon fleet arrived off Corfu under Admiral Ganteaume after slipping past the British blockade. Ganteaume landed large quantities of troops and supplies before returning to Toulon in early March without meeting the British fleet sent to search for them. This was the last successful foray into the region by a French force of this size.; 2 May, HMS Unite under Captain Patrick Campbell began a cruise in the Gulf of Venice, capturing numerous coastal vessels and preventing the movement of shipping off the Adriatic's busiest seaport. Unite captured three Franco-Italian brigs sent her, Ronco on 2 May, and Nettuno and Teulié on 31 May, and drove a fourth back to Venice. Ronco later became HMS Tuscan, Nettuno HMS Cretan and Teulié HMS Roman.; 26 June, British ship of the line HMS Standard, employed in the blockade of Corfu under Captain Thomas Harvey, chased the Italian gunboat Volpe and the French dispatch boat Léger. Despite heavy fire from the shore, Standard's boats suffered no casualties in attacking and capturing both of the vessels.	6 February, Napoleon secretly ordered the French armies stationed in Spain to seize important Spanish fortresses and cities. Spanish military resistance was initially weak and the French were easily able to overrun Spanish defences and had captured most of the country by 18 March, despite growing resistance from irregular regional forces.; 1 August, 14,000 British troops under General Sir Arthur Wellesley (later the Duke of Wellington) landed in Portugal to assist the popular uprising against French military rule following massacres in Madrid in May and the Spanish victory at Bailén in July. Naval support for this army was extensive and would remain the Mediterranean Fleet's highest priority throughout the next seven years of warfare. This initial army was withdrawn by Sir Harry Burrard on 10 November, but a second force was landed in Galicia in the autumn. This army was also forced to withdraw in January 1809, after a French army under Napoleon defeated the Spanish forces in Northern Spain and threatened to cut off the British force from its supplies in Corunna.; 5–16 October, a Frano-Neapolitan army successfully invaded and captured the island of Capri on the western coast of Italy despite unsuccessful attempts by the Royal Navy to intercept and destroy the invasion force.
1809	8 February, British frigate HMS Amphion under William Hoste and sloop HMS Redwing landed shore parties on Melida (Mljet), seizing two merchant brigs and routing local defenders.; 14 February, HMS Belle Poule under Captain James Brisbane pursued the disarmed French frigate Var north of Corfu. Var took shelter under the fort at Valona, but Brisbane attacked on the following morning and captured her. Var later joined the Royal Navy as HMS Chichester.; 12 March, French frigates Danaé and Flore arrived in the Adriatic carrying large quantities of supplies for Corfu. As they approached the island, the small British brig HMS Kingfisher spotted and shadowed them, signalling the nearby frigate HMS Topaze which closed with the French frigates. The French exchanged shots with Topaze for several hours before safely reaching the harbour at Corfu, having been ordered not to engage British ships of similar force en route.; 1 April, a small squadron under the command of William Hoste in HMS Amphion began a spring campaign against the north-eastern Italian coast. Boats from HMS Mercury raided Rovigno (Rovinj) and seized the gunboat Léda under heavy fire.; 23 April, HMS Amphion, HMS Spartan and HMS Mercury landed shore parties at Pesaro and routed the defenders. Landing parties captured 13 vessels, burnt others and blew up Pesaro Castle.; 2 May, HMS Spartan under Jahleel Brenton and HMS Mercury attacked Cesenatico, drove off the defenders, captured 12 vessels and blew up the castle and gun batteries.; 15 May, a shore party from HMS Mercury attacked Rotti and burnt seven coastal vessels in the harbour.; 31 May, Boats from HMS Topaze raided a sheltered anchorage at Demata on Santa Maura and seized nine French gunboats, suffering only one man killed and another wounded.; 28 July, boats from HMS Excellent and sloops HMS Acorn and HMS Bustard raided the harbour of Duino near Trieste. Avoiding the fire of the port's gun batteries, the raiders captured six gunboats and ten coastal merchant vessels.; 27 August, HMS Amphion landed a shore party at Cortellazzo. The force overwhelmed the defences and captured six gunboats and two small merchant ships. Five other coastal vessels were burnt and a gun battery and barracks blown up.; 7 September, boats from HMS Mercury landed at Barletta and captured the Neapolitan schooner Pugliese.; 1 October, a British squadron under John Spranger in HMS Warrior landed 1,900 soldiers under John Oswald on Cephalonia, prompting the immediate surrender of the island's Neapolitan garrison. Within days the nearby islands of Zante and Ithaca also fell without a fight while troops from Spartan seized Cerigo.	9 April, the Austrian army under Archduke Charles attacked Bavaria, an ally of France. This offensive began the War of the Fifth Coalition. Napoleon led his main force against the Austrians in Southern Germany, winning a string of battles including significant victories at Abensberg and Eckmühl before suffering a rare defeat at Aspern-Essling. The campaign concluded in July following the French victory at the Battle of Wagram which forced Archduke Charles to sue for peace. On the shores of the Adriatic, minor Austrian armies under Archduke John had threatened French-held territory in Tyrol and Illyria but French forces under Eugène de Beauharnais were able to hold them off without severe difficulty.; 22 April, Sir Arthur Wellesley landed in Portugal and proceeded to drive the French out of most of the country in a series of small battles. Advancing into Spain, Wellesley won a major victory over the French on 27 July at the Battle of Talavera but was unable to maintain his advance and was forced to retreat to Portugal for the winter. Elsewhere in Spain, independent Spanish armies were defeated at a number of battles and British naval forces harassed French units, fortifications and convoys along the Spanish coast.; 14 October, the Treaty of Schönbrunn was signed, ending the War of the Fifth Coalition. Among the many territorial concessions the Austrians were forced to make were the entire Adriatic coastlines of Illyria and Dalmatia. These were to be directly administered from France and garrisoned with French troops.; 21–25 October, the last serious effort by a battle squadron of the French Toulon fleet to escape the British blockade ended in failure. Ordered to relieve the besieged garrison at Barcelona, a squadron accompanied by troopships left Toulon followed by a British squadron under Thomas Byam Martin. In five days of running conflict a number of smaller French ships were captured and two French ships of the line were driven ashore and burnt. The remainder of the French squadron limped back to Toulon over the next few months, after sheltering from further attack in Cette.
1810	22 March – 16 April, a squadron consisting of HMS Magnificent, HMS Montagu, Belle Poule and the transport ship Imogen landed a sizeable force of British regulars and Greek levies on the island of Santa Maura. In a brief but successful siege this force, commanded by John Oswald, forced the surrender of the principal fortress and with it secured the island and its garrison.; 28 June, the boats of HMS Amphion and HMS Cerberus landed shore parties at Grado near Venice and attacked prepared French defensive positions. The defences were rapidly taken and the town seized. French reinforcements sent from inland were ambushed by the landing party and forced to surrender. The raid captured 62 French soldiers and 25 coastal vessels.; 29 September, the newly arrived French frigates Favorite under Bernard Dubourdieu and Uranie joined the Venetian squadron of Corona, Bellona and Carolina. The force then sailed from Chiozzo to Ancona, arriving on 6 October, having sighted Hoste's Amphion in the distance during the passage.; 20 October, Hoste took Amphion to Ancona to monitor Dubourdieu's movements, but the French commodore had already sailed on 18 October. Hoste led his squadron south to search for Dubourdieu on the passage to Corfu and this assumed destination of the French force was confirmed by a Scilian privateer. In fact however, the French force arrived off Lissa on 22 October. Several hundred Italian troops were landed the next day, forcing the British garrison to retreat into the island's mountainous interior. Dubourdieu captured or burnt a number of vessels at Port St. George, but reembarked his troops and sailed back to Ancona after only eight hours of occupation when local fishermen informed him of Hoste's approach from the south. Late on 23 October, HMS Cerberus arrived off Lissa, but Hoste's main force did not appear until 26 October, by which time Dubourdieu had reached Ancona.	21 July, a French army under Andre Masséna invaded Portugal. Despite being defeated at the Battle of Bussaco, Masséna was able to besiege the Allied army behind the Lines of Torres Vedras. During the campaign, the French army suffered from poor supplies in the empty countryside and was forced to withdraw in March 1811 without inflicting a decisive blow.
1811	4–12 February, British frigates HMS Cerberus and HMS Active raided along the Italian coast, sending boats into Pescara to size four coastal merchant ships sheltering in the harbour on 4 February. On 12 February, boats landed sailors and marines near Ortona, seizing an armed trabaccolo and storming the defences from cliffs overlooking the batteries. Despite heavy fire, only four British sailors were wounded in the attack. In the harbour the raiding party captured ten coastal vessels and burnt two magazines filled with supplies intended for the garrison of Corfu.; 11 March, the Battle of Lissa. The French frigate squadron under Dubourdieu that had wintered in Ancona emerged to conduct a second invasion of Lissa, this time intended to be a permanent occupation. Dubourdieu mustered six French and Italian frigates and numerous smaller ships, carrying over 500 Italian soldiers. The French force was spotted by Hoste's British squadron as they approached the island and the two forces fought a battle off the northern coast. Early in the action Dubourdieu was killed by fire from Hoste's flagship Amphion and his ship Favorite driven ashore and wrecked. The action then became general, with the French force scattering after Amphion forced the surrender of Flore and Bellona. Corona was chased down and captured by Active, but the rest of the squadron escaped, including Flore, which had not been boarded by a British prize crew. The action ended the last French attempt to contest superiority in the Adriatic.; 25 March, French frigates Adrienne and Amélie departed from Toulon with the storeship Dromadaire carrying supplies for Corfu. Within hours, the squadron was attacked by a British squadron under Robert Otway in HMS Ajax and driven into Portoferraio, later returning to Toulon. The slow Dromedaire was outrun by her pursuers on 30 March and captured.; 4 May, boats from HMS Belle Poule and HMS Alceste attacked Parenzo harbour, where a French brig carrying supplies to the survivors of the Battle of Lissa was sheltering. Seizing an island at the mouth of the harbour, the British ships fired mortar shells at the brig until it caught fire and burnt to the waterline.; 27 November, HMS Eagle chased the French frigates Uranie and Corcyre (armed en flute), and corvette Scemplone near Fano. Uranie and Scemplone escaped but Corceyre was overhauled and captured.; 28–29 November, Action of 29 November 1811. A French convoy consisting of frigates Pauline, Pomone and armed storeship Persanne sailed north from Corfu, heading for Trieste with a cargo of over 200 cannon. As they passed the Dalmatian Islands they were chased by a British frigate squadron under Captain Murray Maxwell in HMS Alceste. The French ships attempted to escape but Pomone and Persanne were both chased down and captured.; 30 November, French frigate Flore was wrecked in a heavy storm off Chioggia.	5 March, a French army blockading the city of Cádiz in Spain was defeated at the Battle of Barrosa by an Anglo-Spanish army that landed behind it with Royal Navy support. Despite this success, the French were allowed to withdraw due to acrimony between the British and Spanish commanders.; 3 May, the French army under Andre Massena besieging the Lines of Torres Vedras in Portugal had been forced to withdraw after running out of supplies and Wellington responded by advancing against them. The armies met at the Battle of Fuentes de Onoro at which Wellington's army forced the French to withdraw from Portugal entirely. A second army under William Beresford fought an inconclusive action with the French at Albuera on 16 May. Allied attempts to besiege the border fortresses of Badajoz and Ciudad Rodrigo ended in failure, and Wellington was forced to withdraw his Anglo-Portuguese army back to the border of Spanish border for the winter.; 15 September, a French autumn campaign against independent Spanish forces in Valencia under Louis Suchet was held up by Spanish forces at Saguntum. Stripping troops from the Portuguese front, the French redoubled their attack and routed the Spanish army under Joaquin Blake. Held up by determined Spanish resistance, the French were unable to capture Valencia until late in December 1811.
1812	22 February, Action of 22 February 1812. The newly constructed French ship of the line Rivoli departed Venice for Trieste on her maiden voyage with a small escort. The British ship of the line HMS Victorious had been blockading the harbour awaiting Rivoli's departure and gave chase, deploying HMS Weasel to engage Rivoli's escorts. In the ensuing conflict the French escort brig Mercure blew up with heavy loss of life and Rivoli was defeated and captured in a five-hour running fight.; 31 August, HMS Bacchante under William Hoste landed a shore party at Port Lemo near Venice and seized a convoy of ship-timber destined for the Venetian shipyards, in addition to its escorts, the French brig Tisiphone and two gunboats.; 9 September, French frigate Danaé was destroyed with heavy loss of life by a sudden magazine explosion while docked at Trieste.; 16 September, HMS Eagle drove a 23 ship convoy ashore while under fire from an Italian battery near Goro. Eagle's boats were then deployed to attack the convoy, burning six ships and capturing 15. Two gunboats were also seized.; 18 September, boats from HMS Bacchante attacked an 18 ship convoy off the Tremiti Islands and captured all of them, as well as eight gunboats employed as escorts.; 21 December, a raiding party from HMS Apollo and HMS Weasel landed at San Cataldo near Lecce, captured the defensive tower over the town and blew it up.	25 January, in Iberia, Wellington, taking advantage of the reduced French armies facing him due to the campaign in Valencia, advanced into Spain. His initial targets were the border fortresses of Ciudad Rodrigo and Badajoz. The capture of these heavily defended bastions cost the British Army heavy casualties, forcing Wellington to rest his army during May on the frontier between Spain and Portugal.; 13 June, with his army rested, Wellington's British army advanced into León, capturing Salamanca and challenging Auguste de Marmont to engage him near the city. In the ensuing battle on 22 July, Wellington inflicted a severe defeat on the French and was able to march deep into French-held Spain. Seizing Madrid, the British army was subsequently held up at the fortress of Burgos. With supplies running low and winter approaching, Wellington was forced once again to retreat to his supply depots in Portugal.; 23 June, the French Army under Napoleon and supported by Austrian and Prussian allies invaded Russia along a broad front centered on Kovno and Vilna. Surprising the disorganised Russian armies, the French pushed deep into Russian territory, crossing the Niemen and Dwina rivers as the Russians fell back before them. Attempts to slow the French at the battles of Ostrovno, Smolensk and Valutino were defeated and on 7 September, the main Russian armies were defeated at the Battle of Borodino, having inflicted serious damage on Napoleon's forces during the engagement. Napoleon captured Moscow a week later but found the city emptied by the retreating Russians. Forced to retreat via the same road used on the advance, the French army had to fend off continual Russian counterattacks, while their supply networks collapsed under the strains of long distances and approaching winter. On 29 November, with his army collapsing around him, Napoleon forced passage of the Berezina River and fell back into Germany, having lost the core of his veteran army.
1813	6 January, HMS Bacchante and HMS Weasel chased five French gunboats off Otranto and overhauled each of them in turn, capturing all five.; 29 January, Admiral Thomas Fremantle led an invasion force of 250 men in HMS Apollo and the privateer Esperanza to the island of Augusta (Lastovo). The force landed unopposed and the island's garrison surrendered without a fight.; 1–3 February, troops under Admiral Fremantle landed on Curzola (Korčula) and marched across the island. The French defenders raised barricades in the main town named also Port Bufalo (Port of Korčula), but the British force successfully stormed the defences.; 2 February, boats of British sloop HMS Kingfisher chased a coastal convoy near Faro, capturing one ship and driving nine ashore under heavy fire from French troops on nearby cliffs.; 14 February, HMS Bacchante chased, caught, captured and burnt the large French gunboat Alcinous near Otranto and seized her eight ship convoy.; 22 March, a shore party from HMS Havannah landed near Vasto, seized a gunboat and burnt a merchant ship.; 11–14 April, Royal Marines of HMS Apollo stormed Devil's Island off Northern Corfu on 11 April and seized two grain ships destined for the Corfu garrison. On 14 April, Apollo's boats raided Malero harbour, forcing the eight grain ships there to scuttle themselves. The island was temporarily seized by a Marines landing force.; 22 April, HMS Weasel fought a running duel with 14 French gunboats and shore batteries around the island of Zirona (Drvenik Mali). Weasel was badly damaged and suffered heavy casualties, but captured three and wrecked three of the gunboats and caused serious damage to the others.; 24 April, shore parties from HMS Apollo landed at San Cataldo, attacked a hastily prepared French barricade and captured 26 soldiers.; 29 April, boats from HMS Elizabeth and HMS Eagle captured five vessels and burnt another from a coastal convoy near Goro despite heavy fire from the shore.; 15 May, HMS Bacchante bombarded and destroyed a gun battery on Karlobag, seized shipping in the harbour and demolished the island's defences.; 17–27 May, boats of HMS Cerberus and HMS Apollo cruised off Brindisi. On 17 May, the boats of the former boarded and seized a French gunboat, and on 27 May boats from both ships attacked a well-armed French convoy leaving the port, capturing three gunboats and four coastal vessels.; 8 June, boats of HMS Elizabeth and HMS Eagle landed marines at Omago in Istria. The force routed the French defenders, captured four ships and destroyed the town's defences.; 12 June, boats from HMS Bacchante attacked seven French gunboats and 14 coastal vessels in Gela-Nova harbour in Abruzzi and captured them despite heavy fire from shore defences.; 17 June, boats from HMS Havannah raid Vasto, capturing ten coastal merchant ships under heavy fire. Marines and sailors from HMS Saracen go ashore on the island of Giuppana (Šipan), surprising the garrison and capturing 36 French soldiers, including the island's commander and the commander of neighbouring Mezzo.; 20 June, 50 sailors from HMS Elizabeth land at Dignano. The town surrenders without a fight and the party captured the garrison and destroyed the town's defences.; 3 July, Admiral Fremantle ordered a large expedition to attack the city of Fiume (Rijeka). Boats from HMS Milford, HMS Elizabeth, HMS Eagle, HMS Bacchante and numerous smaller ships attacked the port's defences early in the morning, carrying them and allowing marines to land in the town itself. A running battle through the city followed, before the garrison fortified themselves in a large house. This held out for sometime, until guns from the boats in the harbour were brought to bear, collapsing the building and forcing the French to surrender. Over 90 vessels were captured, many being restored to their local owners while others were burnt or sent to Lissa laden with captured arms and supplies. The city's defences were blown up and the 350-strong garrison made prisoners. British losses were one killed and six wounded.; 5 July, the British squadron that raided Fiume under Admiral Fremantle attacked Porto Ré, forcing the defenders to scuttle 13 coastal vessels and destroying the gun batteries at Bocca Ré.; 7 July, HMS Eagle bombarded the castle at Farasina into submission before blowing it up.; 2 August, Landing parties from HMS Eagle and HMS Bacchante attacked the town of Rovigno (Rovinj), drove out the defenders, blew up the defences and captured or destroyed 21 vessels.; 4 August, Marines from HMS Milford and HMS Weasel landed on the island of Ragosniza (Rogoznica), crossed it overnight and attacked the island's battery at first light from the land. The fortification was taken and blown up.; 5 October, linking with the advancing Austrian Army, Admiral Fremantle blockaded Trieste with HMS Milford, HMS Eagle and smaller ships while the Austrians besieged it by land. On 10 October a French gun battery fired on Milford from close range, but the British ship destroyed the battery with heavy cannon fire. Over the next week, British sailors and marines joined the siege and reinforced the Austrian troops under Count Nugent. British gun batteries supported Austrian attacks, and on 29 October the city's castle fell.; 12 October, HMS Bacchante, HMS Saracen and several smaller craft attacked a French gunboat force off the island of St George that protects the anchorage of Cattaro (Kotor), seizing all four. The following day the boats of the squadron attacked the island itself and captured it, stationing a garrison to blockade Cattaro.	22 May, with the French retreating in Central Europe and their armies in Iberia distracted by several bitter partisan campaigns, Wellington was able to advance deep into French-held territory with his Anglo-Portuguese army and their Spanish allies from their bases on the Portuguese border. As the French armies in Spain fell back to Vitoria, Wellington pursued them closely and engaged on 21 June, breaking the French army at a battle near the town. French resistance in Northern Spain collapsed and Wellington pursued them to the Pyrenees, laying siege to San Sebastián.; 3 June, A British army that had won a minor victory in Catalonia in April was landed under Sir John Murray near Tarragona by the Royal Navy, with orders to lay siege to the city. The operation was a failure, as Murray lost his nerve and re-embarked his troops before French relief forces arrived.; 25 July, with Wellington preoccupied at San Sebastián, the French armies expelled from Spain counterattacked the Anglo-Portuguese lines in the Battle of the Pyrenees and almost broke the British defenders. During the late summer and autumn, a series of battles disputed the frontier, before Wellington defeated the French offensive and successfully entered French territory, pushing northwards towards the city of Toulouse.; with the French armies in Germany in disarray following the disastrous campaign in Russia of the previous year, the Coalition of Russia, Prussia and Sweden prepared to advance across a broad front stretching from the North Sea to the Alps. This advance was hampered however by poor coordination between the national forces, and Napoleon was able to call up reinforcements and reconstitute his armies before the Coalition could strike a decisive blow in Germany. Concentrating near Leipzig, Napoleon invited the still disorganised Prussian and Russian forces to fight him and inflicted heavy losses on them at the battles of Lützen and Bautzen. Both sides agreed to a brief armistice in June to regroup, before war began again on 14 August, the Coalition joined by the Austrian Empire. Napoleon again invited the Coalition to attack him in Southeastern Germany and again inflicted defeats on their advancing armies, most significantly against the Austrians at the Battle of Dresden. Despite this victory, a string of smaller Coalition successes against Napoleon's marshals formed the prelude to the Battle of Leipzig on 16 October. This battle, the largest fought in Europe to that date, was a significant victory for the Coalition and drove Napoleon out of Germany, although with much of his army intact.
1814	6 January, British frigate HMS Bacchante and sloop HMS Saracen received the surrender of the fortress of Cattaro (Kotor) after ten days of constant bombardment.; 28 January, Ragusa surrenders to Captain Hoste in HMS Bacchante, HMS Saracen and an Austrian force besieging the city from the landward side.; 3 February, with the British dominant in the Adriatic and the war drawing to a close, the commander of the French frigate Uranie decided to save his ship from capture by setting fire to her in Brindisi harbour.; 16 February, Admiral Fremantle informs Admiral Pellew that the Adriatic is secured; that British naval forces and Austrian land armies had captured the entire Dalmatian and Croatian coasts as well as substantial parts of Italy. Over 700 French and Italian ships had been seized by the British forces and sold as prizes.	1 January, the Prussian army under General von Blücher crossed the Rhine, the armies of Russia, Austria, Sweden and the German Kingdoms following closely behind. Napoleon had been forced to abandon most of the periphery of his Empire (including the Ilyrian Provinces and most of the Italian coast), following the defeat at Leipzig, concentrating his armies in the region of Paris. With the Coalition pushing onwards into France, the armies traded victories at Brienne and La Rothière, the overwhelming numerical superiority of the Coalition forcing Napoleon back. Counter attacking, Napoleon inflicted a series of stinging victories over the Prussians in the Six Days Campaign, but was only able to delay the Coalition's advance. During February and March, Napoleon won further victories against Coalition armies, particularly at Montreau, Craonne and Saint-Dizier. He was, however, unable to capitalise and the victories were interspersed with defeats that eventually pushed his armies into the Paris suburbs. At the battles of Montmartre and Paris, Napoleon was defeated and on 6 April was forced to abdicate as Emperor.; 10 April, as the war in Europe came to its inevitable conclusion in the north, the Allied armies in the south of France, under Lord Wellington, pushed the French forces back to their regional centre of Toulouse. There Wellington defeated the French a final time at the Battle of Toulouse, unaware that peace had already been agreed. Troops landed by the Royal Navy had already recaptured Barcelona and driven the French out of Catalonia.; 11 April, At the Treaty of Fontainebleau, Napoleon formally surrendered and left France with 600 hand-picked men for exile on Elba. He was conveyed there by the Royal Navy frigate HMS Inconstant.

== See also ==
- Timeline of French history
- Timeline of 19th century French history
