= Nicolò Pasqualigo =

Italian naval officer (1770–1821)

- Born: 16 July 1770; Republic of Venice
- Died: 13 January 1821 (aged 50) Venice, Italy (aged 50) (aged 50)
- Allegiance: Republic of Venice (1786–1797); Kingdom of Italy (1805–1814); Austrian Empire (1815–1821)
- Rank: Sopracomito (Venice); Captain (Italy); Counter-Admiral (Austria)
- Conflicts: Venetian bombardments of the Beylik of Tunis; Napoleonic Wars; Adriatic campaign of 1807–1814; Battle of Lissa
- Awards: Order of the Iron Crown; Military Order of Christ; Order of the Iron Crown

Counter-Admiral Nicolò Pasqualigo (27 July 1770 – 13 January 1821) was an Italian naval officer who served in the Napoleonic Wars. Born into the Venetian nobility, he successively served in the navies of the Republic of Venice, Kingdom of Italy and Austrian Empire.

== Early life ==
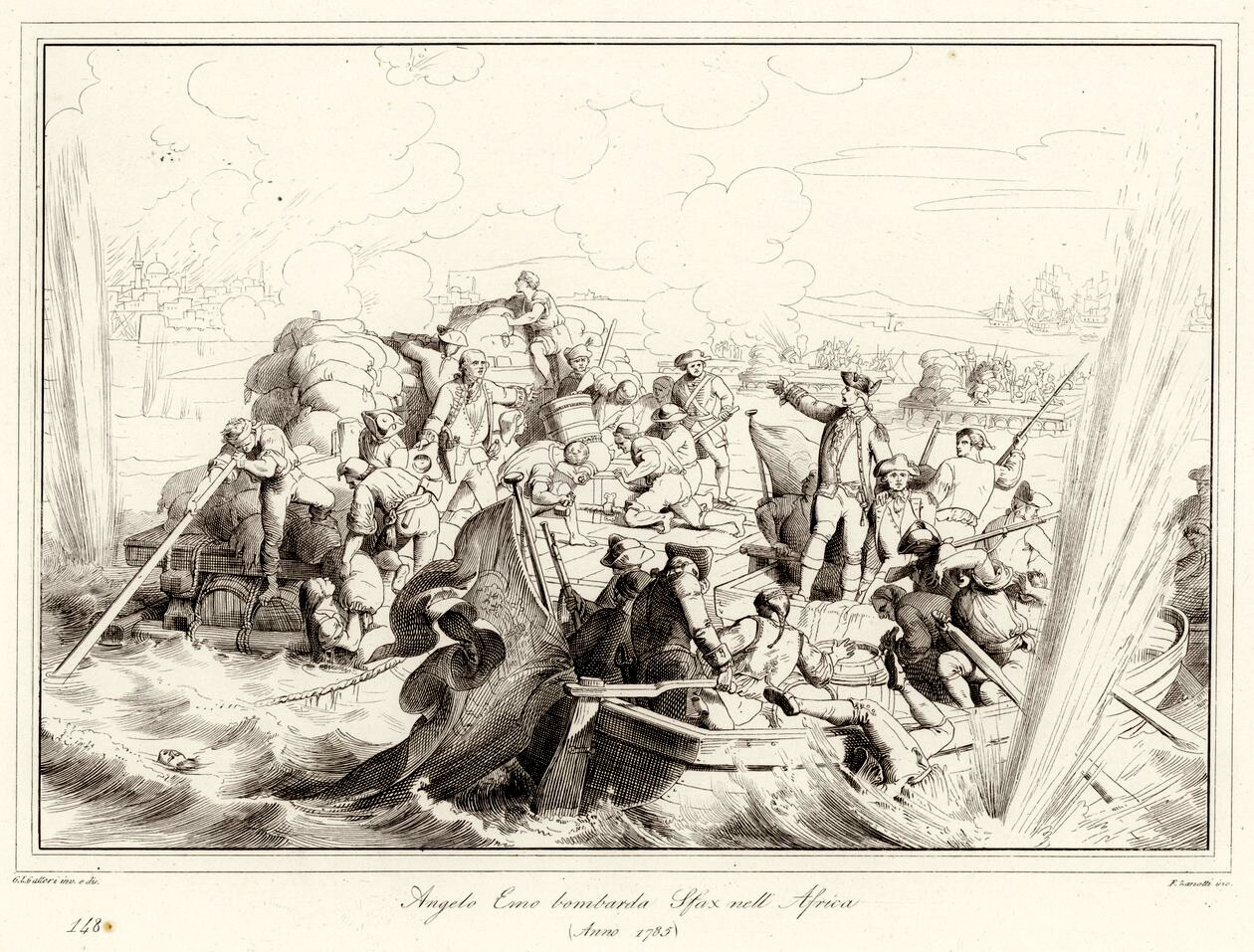
The Venetian bombardments of the Beylik of Tunis, which Pasqualigo participated in

Nicolò Pasqualigo was born on 16 July 1770 in the Republic of Venice. Born into the Venetian nobility, in 1786 he joined the Venetian navy at the age of sixteen, serving in a galley as a cadet; his decision to voluntarily join the navy was unusual as most young Venetian noblemen attempted to avoid military service during this period. Shortly after joining, Pasqualigo was transferred on his own request from the armata sottile, the navy's galley and galleass branch, to the armata grossa, its tall ship branch.

In the armata grossa, he participated in the final Venetian bombardments of the Beylik of Tunis under Angelo Emo in 1786, distinguishing himself during the campaign. Pasqualigo was subsequently promoted to the rank of sopracomito and made the captain of a galley stationed in Venetian Dalmatia. In mid-1797, Pasqualigo received news of the fall of the Republic of Venice while in Zara, bringing his service with the Venetian navy to an end.

== Napoleonic Wars ==
In 1805, Pasqualigo was commissioned into the navy of the Kingdom of Italy, which had been founded that year as a client state of the First French Empire. He was appointed as the director of the Venetian Arsenal in the same year. In October 1810, Pasqualigo participated in an attack on the British-occupied island of Lissa under French Captain Bernard Dubourdieu as part of the Adriatic campaign of 1807–1814. On 23 October, Dubourdieu led a squadron, which included the 40-gun frigate Corona under Pasqualigo, to occupy the island's main town of Port St. George. 700 Italian troops disembarked and briefly occupied the town, capturing and burning several prize ships captured by the British before retreating.

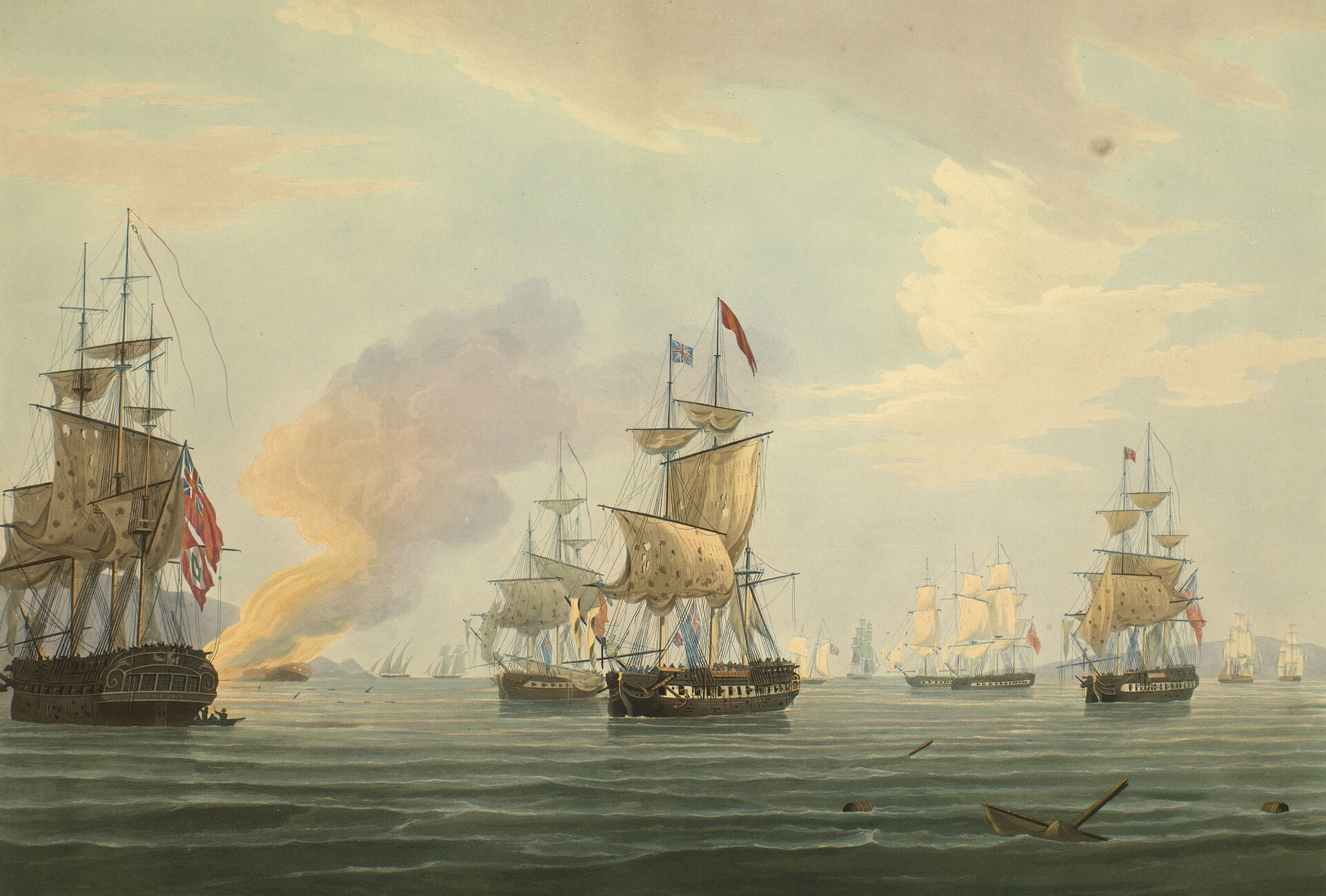
Corona (centre left), Pasqualigo's ship at the Battle of Lissa

By the following year, Royal Navy attacks against French- and Italian-flagged coastal shipping had led Dubourdieu to mount an attempt to permanently eradicate the British threat in the Adriatic. In March 1811, he assembled a squadron of six frigates, one brig, two schooners, one xebec and two gunboats, taking advantage of the temporary absence of the British ship of the line HMS Montagu from the region. Pasqualigo, remaining in command of Corona at the rank of corvette captain, was once again part of Dubourdieu's squadron.

On 13 March, Dubourdieu's squadron encountered a British squadron let by William Hoste near Lissa. In the ensuing battle, Corona engaged the frigate HMS Cerberus in a short-range naval duel, with both ships being heavily damaged. The destruction of Dubourdieu's ship Favorite and his death, along with the arrival of the British frigate HMS Active, forced Pasqualigo to retreat eastwards alongside Danaé and Carolina. Active, the only British ship still in fighting condition, quickly caught up with Corona at 12:30, with the two ships manoeuvring into the most optimal position before engaging at 13:45. After 45 minutes of fierce fighting, Pasqualigo was forced to strike his colours when a fire broke out onboard Corona.

The crew of Corona suffered roughly 200 men killed and wounded during the battle, including Pasqualigo, who was taken prisoner. The British, who allowed him to keep his sword in recognition of his bravery during the battle, took Pasqualigo to Malta where he was imprisoned for a period of time before being released and returning to Venice. For his role in the battle, Pasqualigo was awarded the Order of the Iron Crown, promoted to the rank of captain and placed in command of a Franco-Italian flotilla in the Adriatic.

== Later life and death ==
Pasqualigo continued to serve in the Kingdom of Italy's navy until it ceased to exist in 1814 following the War of the Sixth Coalition. In the next year, he was commissioned into the Austrian navy at the rank of ship-of-the-line captain. In Austrian service, Pasqualigo was given the nobiliary particle von, being referred to as Nicolò von Pasqualigo. He was given command over a squadron and assigned the mission of carrying out naval patrols in the Mediterranean to counter Barbary corsairs. In 1817, Pasqualigo escorted Maria Leopoldina of Austria to Brazil to be married to Prince Pedro. Upon arriving in Brazil, he was made a member of the Military Order of Christ; when Pasqualigo returned to Austria, he was made Knight Third Class of the Order of the Iron Crown. In 1818, Pasqualigo was appointed as Chamberlain of the Empire and in the following year accompanied Francis II, Holy Roman Emperor on a voyage between Rome and Naples, at the end of which he was promoted to the rank of counter admiral. Pasqualigo died of a heart attack in Venice on 13 January 1821, and was buried in the San Michele in Isola.
