= Battle of Lissa =

There have been two naval battles of Lissa:

- Battle of Lissa (1811) (13 March 1811), where British frigates defeated a French & Venetian fleet.
- Battle of Lissa (1866) (20 July 1866), where the Austrian fleet defeated the Italian fleet during the Austro-Prussian War

For the land battle which took place at a similar-sounding location on 5 December 1757, where the Prussian army repelled the Austrians, see Battle of Leuthen.
