= Battle of Vis =

Battle of Vis may refer to:

- Battle of Lissa (1811), a naval action between British and allied French-Venetian forces during the Adriatic campaign of the Napoleonic Wars
- Battle of Lissa (1866), a naval action between Austrian Empire and Italian forces during the Third Italian Independence War
