= Henry Whitby =

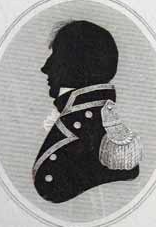
Capt Henry Whitby, Royal Navy

Henry Whitby (21 July 1781 – 6 May 1812) was a British seaman who became a captain in the Royal Navy. He fought during the French Revolutionary Wars and Napoleonic Wars. He joined the navy in 1794 as a midshipman. He commanded HMS Leander and HMS Centaur. He married the second daughter of John Nicholson Inglefield.

Born at Creswall Hall, Staffordshire, he was the seventh and youngest son of the Rev. Thomas Whitby and his wife, Mabella Turton, and the brother of Captain John Whitby. He entered the navy in 1794 as a midshipman aboard HMS Excellent under his brother's command, serving under Rear-Admiral William Cornwallis in the Channel Fleet. By 1795 he had transferred to HMS Royal Sovereign, although illness prevented his participation in the Cornwallis Retreat. Subsequent service included time aboard HMS Alcmene, HMS Thalia, and HMS Triton, and he was reportedly present at the Battle of the Nile in 1798. Commissioned lieutenant in 1799, he served in HMS Prince George and later in HMS Leviathan on the Jamaica station, where he briefly commanded several vessels, including HMS Proselyte and HMS Pelican, being promoted commander in 1802.

Whitby was posted captain on 6 February 1804 and commanded HMS Desirée and later HMS Centaur in the Caribbean. In 1805 the Centaur was dismasted and nearly lost in a hurricane while attempting to join Lord Nelson's fleet. After marrying Catherine Dorothea Inglefield, daughter of Commissioner John Nicholson Inglefield, at Halifax, Nova Scotia, Whitby took command of HMS Leander. In April 1806 a shot fired from that ship accidentally killed an American sailor off New York, leading to diplomatic controversy and demands by President Thomas Jefferson for Whitby's arrest. Tried by court-martial in 1807, he was acquitted of all blame but, to soothe his American accusers, he was kept out of the service for several years, during which his health deteriorated somewhat.

In 1809 Whitby returned to active service commanding HMS Cerberus, initially in the Baltic, where he participated in an attack on Russian gunboats near Fredericksham. Transferred to the Mediterranean, he took part in operations along the Adriatic coast and fought in the Battle of Lissa on 13 March 1811, where the Cerberus suffered heavy casualties. Afterward, Whitby was appointed to the new frigate HMS Briton, but his declining health prevented him from taking her to sea. He died at age 31 and was buried at St Margaret's Church in Rochester alongside his wife, who had previously died from tuberculosis in 1810.
