= French corvette Var (1806) =

Var
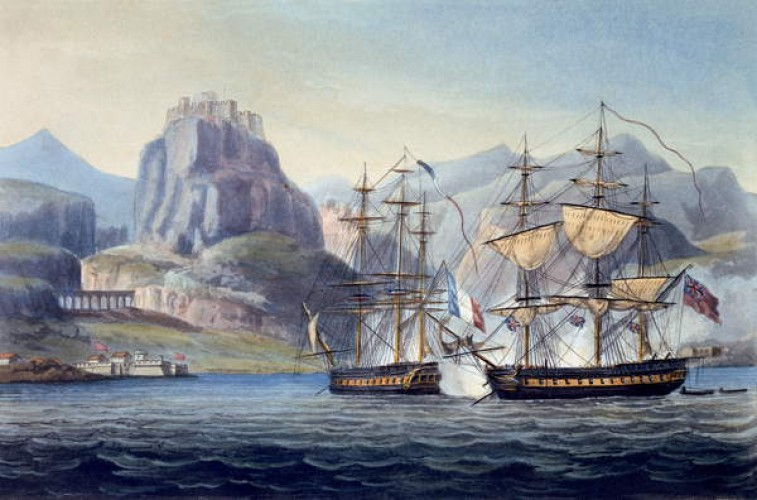
- Capture of Var by HMS Belle Poule off Corfu 1809

History

France
- Name: Var
- Namesake: Var (department)
- Ordered: 26 March 1805
- Builder: La Ciotat
- Laid down: July 1805
- Launched: 8 September 1806
- Fate: Captured February 1809

United Kingdom
- Name: Chichester
- Acquired: February 1809 by capture
- Fate: Wrecked 2 May 1811

General characteristics
- Class & type: Var-class flute
- Displacement: 800 tons (French)
- Tons burthen: 777 (bm)
- Length: Overall: 140 ft 10 in (42.9 m); Keel: 118 ft 10 in (36.2 m)
- Beam: 35 ft 0 1/2 in (10.7 m)
- Depth of hold: 11 ft 6 1/2 in (3.5 m)
- Propulsion: Sail
- Complement: French service:101–159; British service:88
- Armament: French service: 22 × 9-pounder guns + 4 × 24-pounder carronades; British service; Upper deck: 14 × 6-pounder guns; QD: 4 × 4-pounder guns

Var was a corvette of the French Navy, launched in 1806 as the name-ship of her class of flutes. She served as a storeship until the British captured her in 1809. She became the transport HMS Chichester, and was wrecked in 1811.

== Career ==
Var was built to a design of Pierre-Alexandre Forfait, though Jacques-Noël Sanė modified it.

On the morning of 14 February 1809, HMS Belle Poule, under the command of Captain James Brisbane, was about 12 leagues north of Corfu when she sighted a suspicious sail. Belle Poule gave chase and caught up with Var the next morning, finding her anchored under the guns of the fortresses guarding Valona. The fortresses did not come to Var's assistance, so after a few broadsides from Belle Poule, Var struck. Var was under the command of capitaine de frégate Paulin, who was sailing her from Corfu to Brindisi. The British suffered no casualties; Brisbane could not assess French casualties as most of Var's officers and men escaped ashore after she struck. (A French court martial on 16 April 1814 acquitted Paulin for the loss of his ship.)

Var was sent to Woolwich for fitting as a storeship, which took from 21 January to 23 March 1810. She was brought into British service as HMS Chichester.

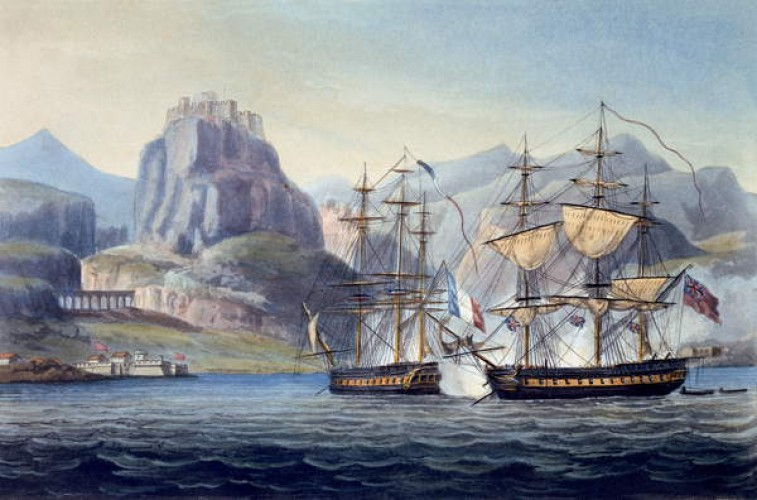
The Capture of Var by HMS Belle Poule in 1809 off Corfu

== Loss ==
On 2 May 1811, as she sailed under Master William Kirby, she was wrecked on the Madras roadstead with the loss of two crew. The violent gale also claimed the frigate Dover, several merchant vessels, and some 70 small craft.
