= French frigate Corona =

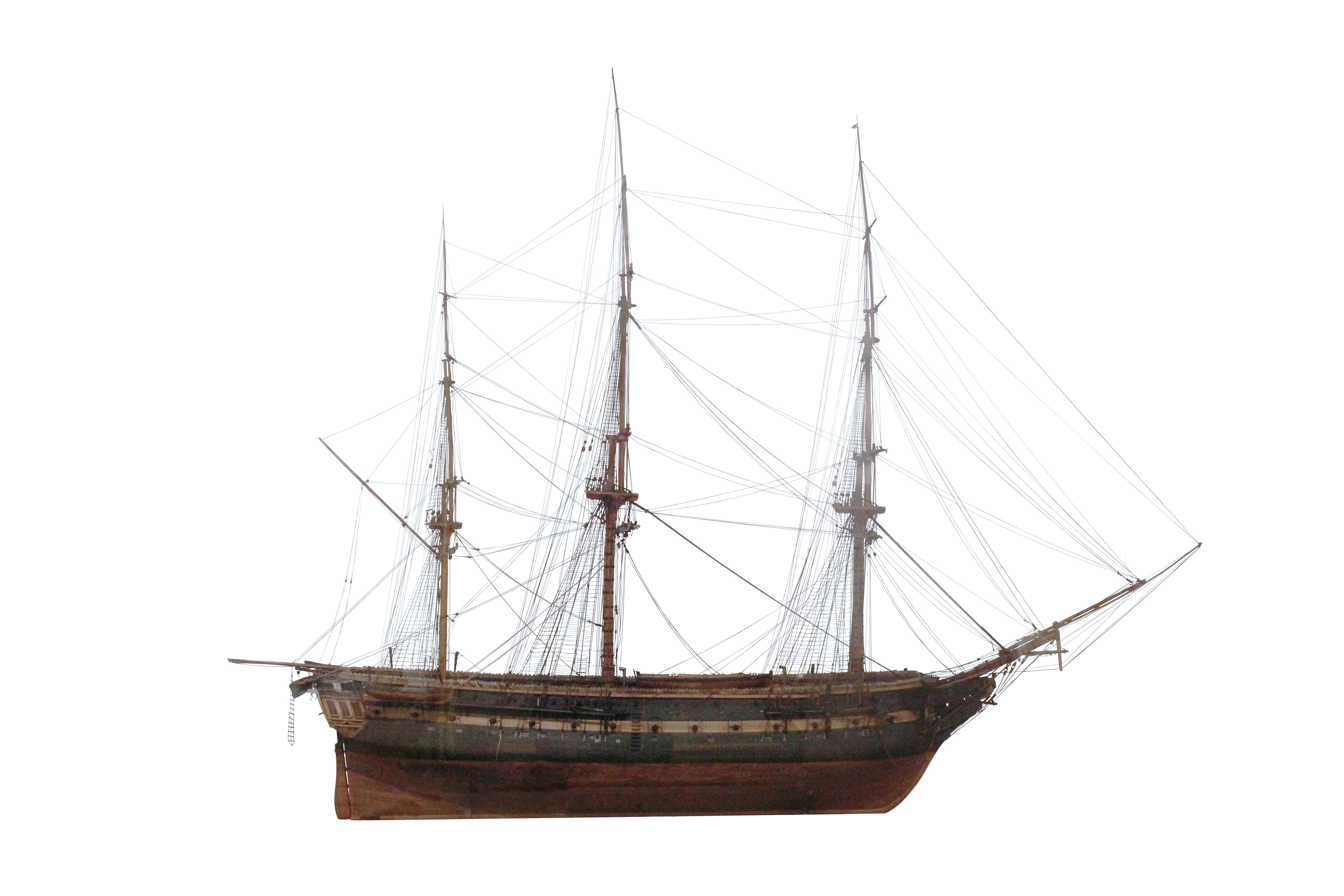
- Hortense, sister-ship of Corona

History

Kingdom of Italy
- Name: Corona
- Namesake: Crown
- Builder: Battistella, Venice
- Launched: 27 December 1807
- Captured: 13 March 1811

United Kingdom
- Name: Daedalus
- Namesake: Daedalus, ancient Greek inventor
- Acquired: 13 March 1811 (by capture)
- Fate: Wrecked, and sunk on 2 July 1813

General characteristics
- Class & type: Pallas-class frigate
- Tons burthen: 1093 81/94 (bm)
- Length: 152 ft 6 in (46.48 m) (overall); 126 ft 11 1/4 in (38.691 m) (keel)
- Beam: 40 ft 3 in (12.27 m)
- Draught: 5.9 m (19 ft)
- Depth of hold: 120 ft 0 1/2 in (36.589 m)
- Propulsion: Sails
- Sail plan: Ship
- Complement: British service: 274, later 315
- Armament: Italian service; UD:28 × 18-pounder long guns; Spardeck: 12 × 8-pounder long guns; British service; UD: 28 × 24-pounder Gover short-barrelled guns; QD: 14 × 24-pounder carronades; Fc: 2 × 6-pounder guns + 2 × 24-pounder carronades

Corona was a 40-gun Pallas-class frigate of the Italian Navy. The French built her in Venice in 1807 for the Napoleonic Kingdom of Italy. The British captured Corona at the Battle of Lissa and took her into the Royal Navy as HMS Daedalus. She grounded and sank off Ceylon in 1813 while escorting a convoy.

== Italian Navy ==
Corona was initially built in Venice for the navy of the Napoleonic Kingdom of Italy, using French plans. She was at Venice in 1809. Under Captain Nicolò Pasqualigo she served as part of the Franco-Italian squadron operating in the Adriatic in 1811 under Commodore Bernard Dubourdieu. On 22 October she entered the port of Lissa and there captured several vessels.

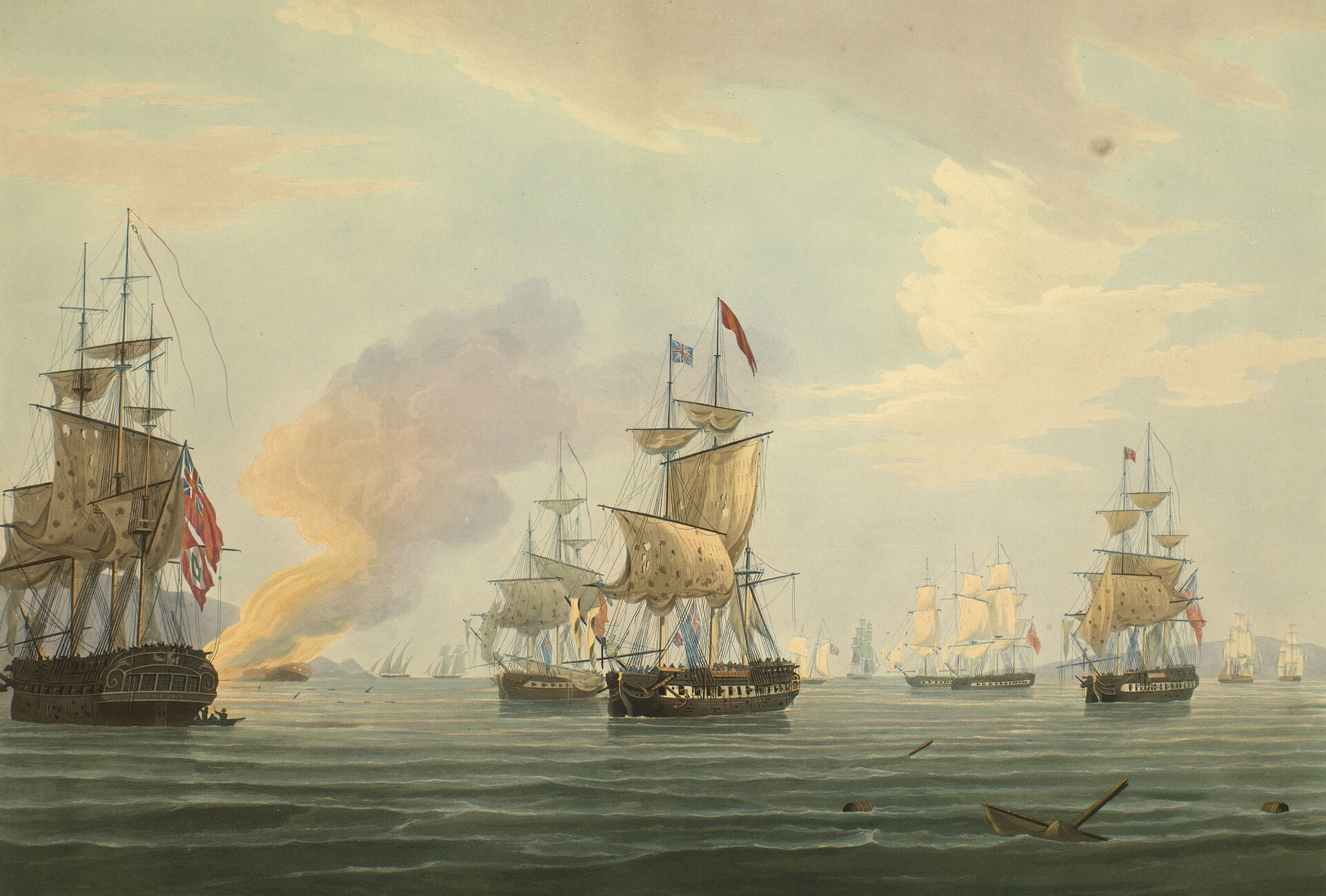
Corona (centre left) at the Battle of Lissa, 1811

Corona was one of the ships that Dubourdieu lost at Lissa on 13 March 1811 during the battle that resulted in his death. Pasqualigo was also wounded and taken prisoner in the battle: in all she lost some 200 men killed and wounded. Following her capture by Active, a fire destroyed much of Corona's upper works and killed members of her crew and five members of the British prize crew before they could extinguish it. In 1847 the Admiralty authorized the issuance of the Naval General Service Medal with clasp "Lissa" to the still living survivors of the battle.

== Royal Navy ==
Her captors took her to Malta and then to Britain where they renamed her Daedalus, Daedalus having just been broken up, and took her into the Royal Navy. She was laid up for a year while her battle damage was repaired. The British considered her weakly built and considered giving her 32-pounder carronades in her battery to reduce the weight of her armament. Instead, they gave her 24-pounder Gover short-barreled guns. In October 1812 she was finally readied for sea under Captain Murray Maxwell, fresh from his own victory in the Adriatic.

Daedalus sailed for the East Indies on 29 January 1813. On 1 July 1813 Daedalus was escorting a number of East Indiamen off Ceylon near Pointe de Galle. Maxwell set a course for Madras that was supposed to take her clear of all shoals. When he believed he was some eight miles off shore he changed course. At 8am on 2 July she grounded on a shoal. Although she hit gently, she had irreparably damaged her bottom. Maxwell and his crew attempted numerous remedies but could not save Daedalus and the Indiamen took off her crew. Within five minutes of Maxwell's departure Daedalus sank. The subsequent court martial ruled that the master, Arthur Webster, had failed to exercise due diligence in that he had failed to take constant depth soundings; the court ordered that he be severely reprimanded.
