= French frigate Amélie =

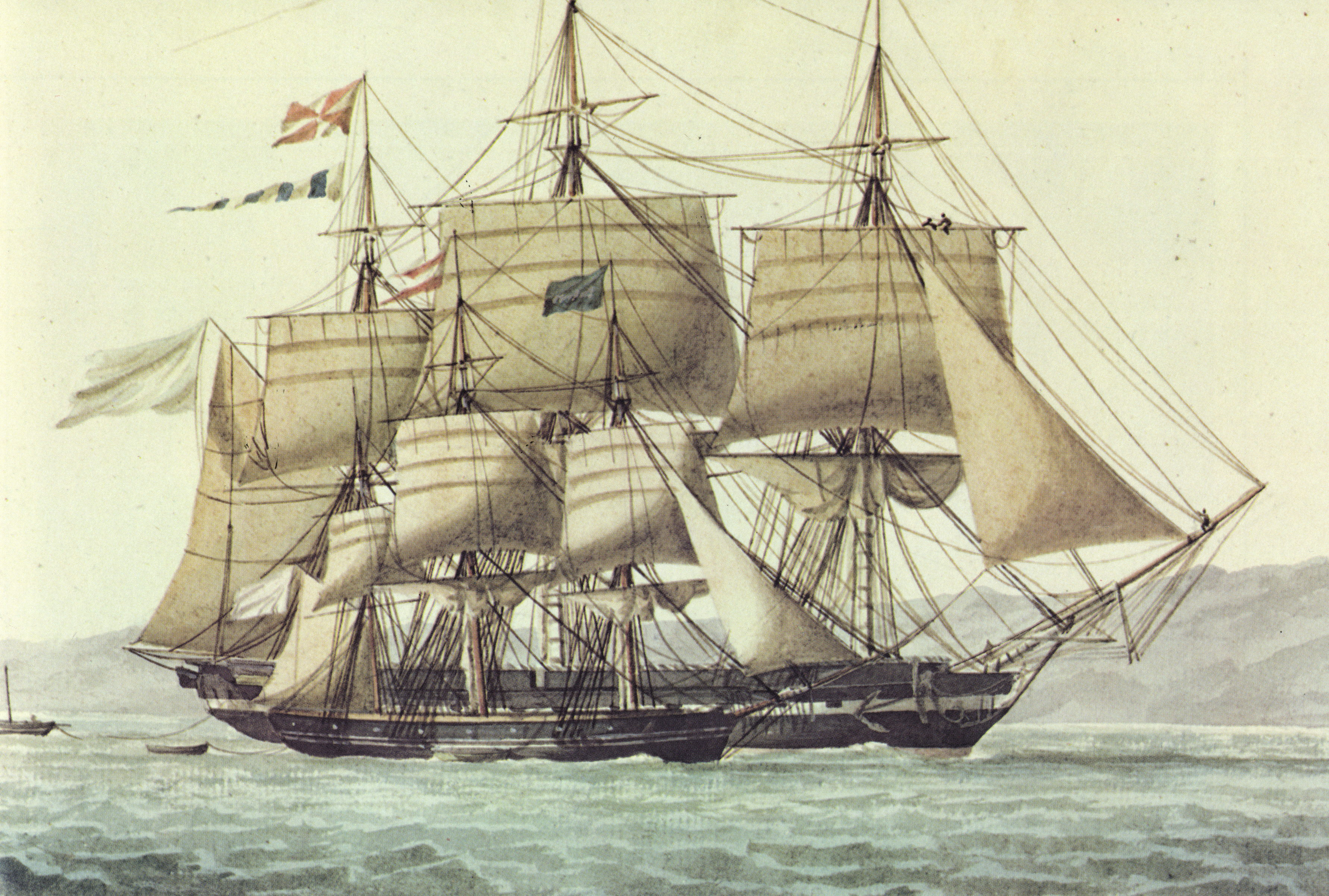
- Junon (ex-Amélie) under Captain Rosamel, capturing a Spanish privateer on 3 March 1823 at 10 in the morning. Aquatint by Antoine Roux.

History

France
- Name: Amélie
- Namesake: Amélie Bonaparte, sister of Napoleon who died in her infancy
- Builder: Toulon
- Laid down: 1807
- Launched: 21 July 1808
- Fate: Broken up on 17 August 1842

General characteristics
- Class & type: Pallas-class frigate
- Displacement: 1,080 tonnes
- Length: 46.93 m (154 ft 0 in)
- Beam: 11.91 m (39 ft 1 in)
- Draught: 5.9 m (19 ft 4 in)
- Propulsion: 1,950 m^{2} (21,000 sq ft) of sail
- Complement: 326
- Armament: Nominally 40 guns; In practice carried either 44 or 46 guns: Battery: 28 18-pounders; Quarterdeck & forecastle: 8 × 8-pounder long guns; 8 × 36-pounder carronades or 12 × 18-pounder carronades

Amélie was a 46-gun Pallas-class frigate of the French Navy. On 21 October 1809, she sailed from Toulon to escort a convoy bound for Barcelona. Chased by a British squadron under Collingwood during the Battle of Maguelone, she managed to escape to Marseille in spite of a broken bowsprit, and eventually reached Toulon on 3 November.

On 29 March 1811, she departed Toulon with Adrienne, escorting the storeship Dromadaire carrying 8 tonnes of gunpowder and ammunition to Corfu. Two days later, the ships ran across a British squadron comprising HMS Unite and HMS Ajax. Dromadaire was captured, while the frigates managed to escape to Portoferraio.

At the Bourbon Restoration, she was renamed Junon, effective from 11 April 1814. She served during the Spanish expedition under Captain Rosamel, capturing a Spanish privateer on 3 March 1823 and engaging in military actions off Barcelona. She served as a transport in Madagascar, then was re-armed in the Mediterranean, before being struck in 1842.
