= French frigate Adrienne =

Pallas-class 46-gun frigate of the French Navy

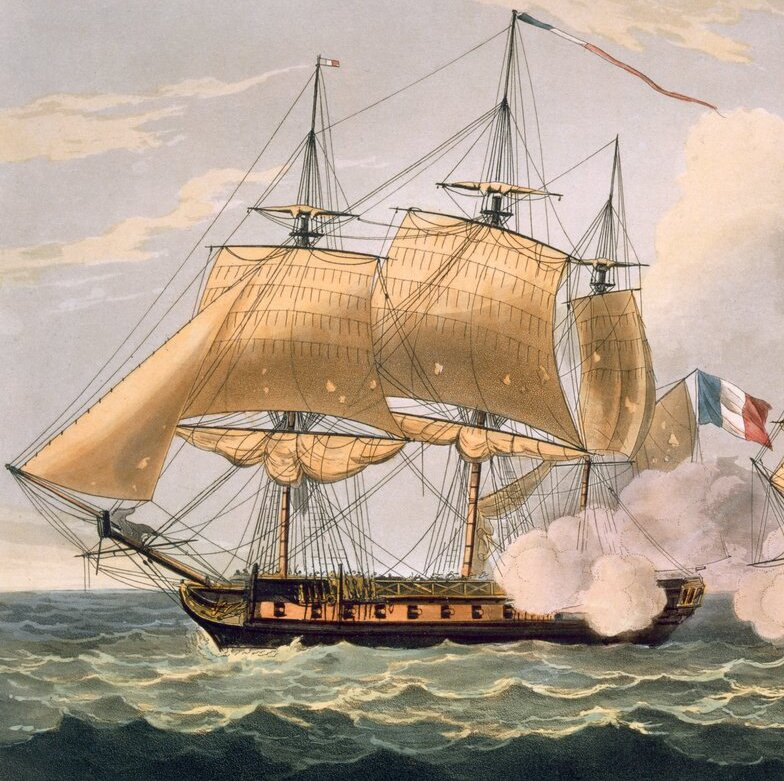
- Clorinde, a sister ship of Adrienne

History

France
- Name: Adrienne
- Namesake: Adrienne Bonaparte, sister of Napoleon who died in her infancy
- Builder: Toulon
- Launched: 15 August 1809
- Fate: Broken up in 1849

General characteristics
- Class & type: Pallas-class frigate
- Displacement: 1,080 tonnes
- Length: 46.93 m (154 ft 0 in)
- Beam: 11.91 m (39 ft 1 in)
- Draught: 5.9 m (19 ft 4 in)
- Propulsion: 1,950 m^{2} (21,000 sq ft) of sail
- Complement: 326
- Armament: Nominally 40 guns; In practice carried either 44 or 46 guns: Battery: 28 18-pounders; Quarterdeck & forecastle: 8 × 8-pounder long guns; 8 × 36-pounder carronades or 12 × 18-pounder carronades

Adrienne was a 46-gun Pallas-class frigate of the French Navy.

On 29 March 1811, she departed Toulon with Amélie, escorting the storeship Dromadaire carrying 8 tonnes of gunpowder and ammunition to Corfu. Two days later, the ships ran across a British squadron comprising HMS Unite and HMS Ajax. Dromadaire was captured, while the frigates managed to escape to Portoferraio.

She was renamed to Aurore on 11 April 1814, to Dauphine on 5 September 1829, and to Aurore again on 9 August 1830.

== Sources and references ==
- Roche, Jean-Michel (2005). "ADRIENNE - Frégate de 46 canons (1809 - 1849)". Dictionnaire des bâtiments de la flotte de guerre française de Colbert à nos jours 1 1671 - 1870. Toulon: Roche. ISBN 978-2-9525917-0-6. OCLC 165892922.
