= HMS Imperieuse (1793) =

Frigate of the Royal Navy

History

France
- Name: Impérieuse
- Ordered: 27 November 1785
- Builder: Toulon
- Laid down: February 1786
- Launched: 11 July 1787
- Commissioned: May 1788
- Captured: 11 October 1793

Great Britain
- Name: HMS Imperieuse
- Acquired: 11 October 1793
- Renamed: HMS Unite on 3 September 1803
- Reclassified: Harbour service from 1832
- Fate: Broken up January 1858

General characteristics
- Class & type: Minerve-class frigate
- Displacement: 1330 tonneaux
- Tons burthen: 700 port tonneaux
- Length: 46.1 m (151 ft 3 in)
- Beam: 11.7 m (38 ft 5 in)
- Draught: 5.5 m (18 ft 1 in)
- Armament: 44 guns

The Impérieuse was a 40-gun Minerve-class frigate of the French Navy. The Royal Navy captured her in 1793 and she served first as HMS Imperieuse and then from 1803 as HMS Unite. She became a hospital ship in 1836 and was broken up in 1858.

== French service and capture ==
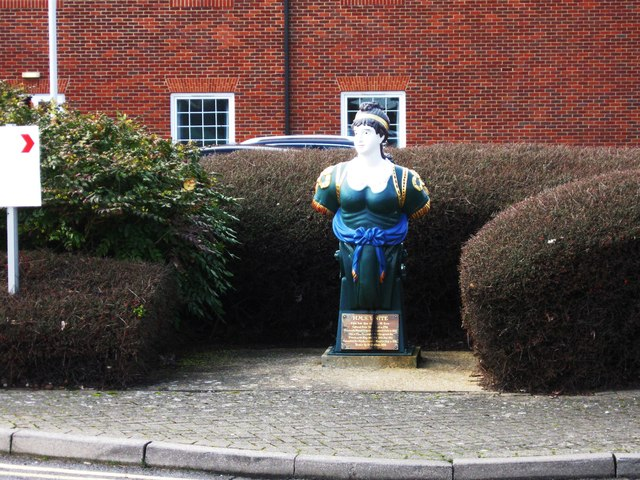
The original figurehead in Gosport

In 1788, Impérieuse cruised in the Middle East, and the Aegean Sea the two following years. She performed another cruise off the Middle East before returning to Toulon. On 11 October 1793, Impérieuse was captured off La Spezia by HMS Captain and the Spanish ship of the line Bahama following the Raid on Genoa.

== British service ==
The Royal Navy commissioned Imperieuse as the fifth-rate frigate HMS Imperieuse.

=== French Revolutionary Wars: HMS Imperieuse ===
Imperieuse entered service in 1795, and operated in the West Indies off Martinique and Surinam for most of the French Revolutionary Wars, under the command of Captain John Beresford. Imperieuse returned to Britain at the Peace of Amiens.

=== Napoleonic Wars: HMS Unite ===
When the Napoleonic Wars began Imperieuse was renamed Unite and returned to service in the Mediterranean. The frigate was under the command of Captain Chaloner Ogle as one of Nelson's scouts, but not present at Trafalgar; instead, she lay dismasted in Lisbon harbour.

Unité, Melpomene and Weazel shared in the capture of the Buona Esperanza on 19 July 1807 and the Bizzaro, on 21 August. The bankruptcy of the prize agents meant that some prize money was not distributed until 21 years later, in 1828. The fourth and final payment for Bizzarro did not occur until July 1850. (Note: A first-class share of the remaining prize money was worth £2 7s 6pence; a fifth-class share, that of a seaman, was worth 3d.)

Under Captain Patrick Campbell Unite was the first frigate to enter the Adriatic Sea and during the spring of 1808 captured a string of French and Italian gunboats and coastal merchant vessels, notably the 16-gun sister-brigs Ronco, Teulié and Nettuno, the first on 2 May 1808 off Cape Promontore, Istria, and then the second two on 1 June 1808 off Zara. Campbell reported no casualties in the capture of Ronco. Teulié lost five men killed and 16 wounded before she struck; Nettuno lost seven killed, two drowned, and 13 wounded. The Royal Navy took all three into service, Ronco under the name HMS Tuscan, Teulié under the name HMS Roman, and Nettuno under the name HMS Cretan.

On 19 May 1810 Unite captured the French privateer Du Guay Trouin of 10 guns and 116 men.

By 1811 Unite was still operating in the Mediterranean, under Captain Chamberlayne.

On 31 March 1811, Unite and Ajax encountered a French squadron comprising the frigates Adrienne and Amélie, and the armed transport French corvette Dromadaire. Ajax captured Dromadaire, while the frigates managed to escape to Portoferraio. Captain Otway of Ajax reported that Dromadaire was frigate-built and sailed remarkably well. Her cargo consisted of 15,000 shot and shells of various sizes and 90 tons of gunpowder. Apparently Napoleon Bonaparte intended them as a present for Hammuda ibn Ali, the Bey of Tunis. Admiral Sir Charles Cotton, commander in chief of the British Mediterranean Fleet, decided to buy her and her stores for the Royal Navy.

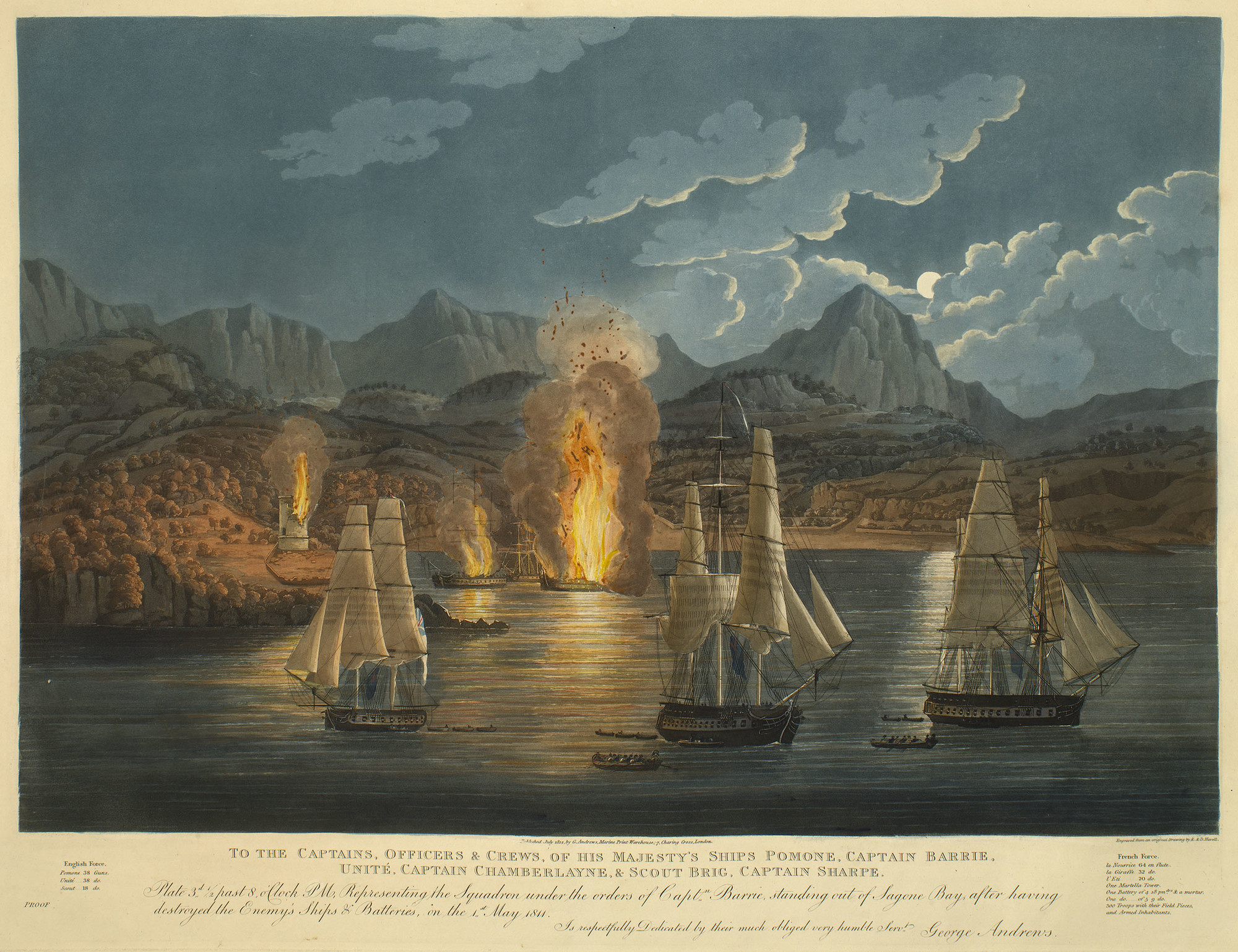
HMS Unité (far right) at Sagone Bay, 1 May 1811

On 1 May, Unite participated in the destruction of the French vessels Giraffe, Nourrice, and an armed merchant man sheltering near the island at Sagone, with the help of HMS Pomone and HMS Scout.

Through the summer Unite operated off the mouth of the Tiber and in the autumn she was once again sent to the Adriatic, participating in the action of 29 November 1811 at which she captured the armed storeship Persanne.

On 16 June 1812 boats from Unite, Orlando and Cerberus captured three vessels of from eighty to one hundred tons in the small port of Badisea, near Otranto.

On 9 November 1812 Unite was in sight when Furieuse captured Nebrophonus.

On 28 May 1813 Unite headed for Palermo. On 12 Feb 1814 she was a part of the fleet, off Toulon, which pursued a French squadron into that harbour,

On 19 August 1814, Unite was preparing to sail, with a convoy of transports, from Cadiz to Spithead. They arrived at Deal on 22 September 1814, whereupon they were held under quarantine.

== Post-war and fate ==
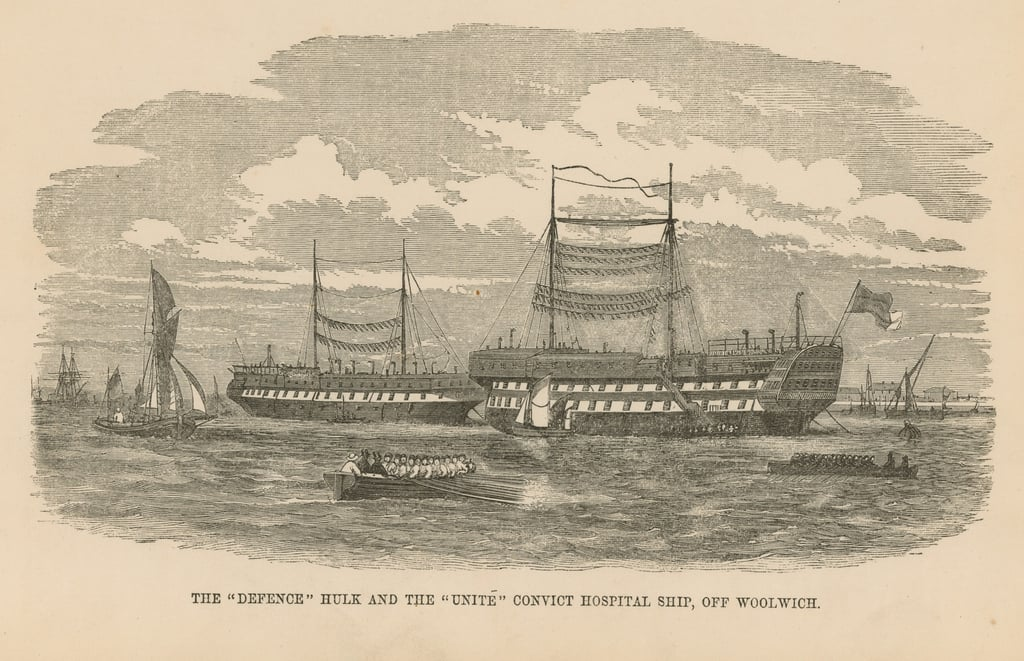
The Defence hulk and the Unite convict hospital ship, off Woolwich

By 1815, Unite was back in Britain in reserve at Deptford and she remained there until converted for harbour service in 1832. Between 1841 and 1858, she was used as a prison hulk. The ship was eventually broken up in January 1858 at Chatham Dockyard.
