= French corvette Dromadaire (1810) =

Dromadaire
History

France
- Name: Dromadaire
- Namesake: Dromedary (Camelus dromedarius)
- Builder: Marseille
- Laid down: June 1808
- Launched: June 1810
- Captured: 31 March 1811

General characteristics
- Tons burthen: c.800 (bm)
- Propulsion: Sail
- Complement: 150
- Armament: 24 long guns

The Dromadaire was a 24-gun store ship of the French Navy.

On 29 March 1811, she departed Toulon under ensiegne de vaiseeau Morin, carrying gunpowder and ammunition for Corfu, escorted by the frigates Adrienne and Amélie. Two days later, the ships ran across a British squadron comprising HMS Unite and HMS Ajax. Ajax captured Dromadaire, while the frigates managed to escape to Portoferraio. Captain Otway of Ajax reported that Dromadaire was frigate-built and sailed remarkably well. Her cargo consisted of 15,000 shot and shells of various sizes and 90 tons of gunpowder. Apparently Napoleon Bonaparte intended them as a present for Hammuda ibn Ali, the Bey of Tunis.

Morin was acquitted for the loss of his ship on 28 December 1811.

Admiral Sir Charles Cotton, commander in chief of the British Mediterranean Fleet, decided to buy her and her stores for the Royal Navy.
