= French frigate Favorite (1810) =

Coordinates: 43°4′36.26″N 16°9′13″E

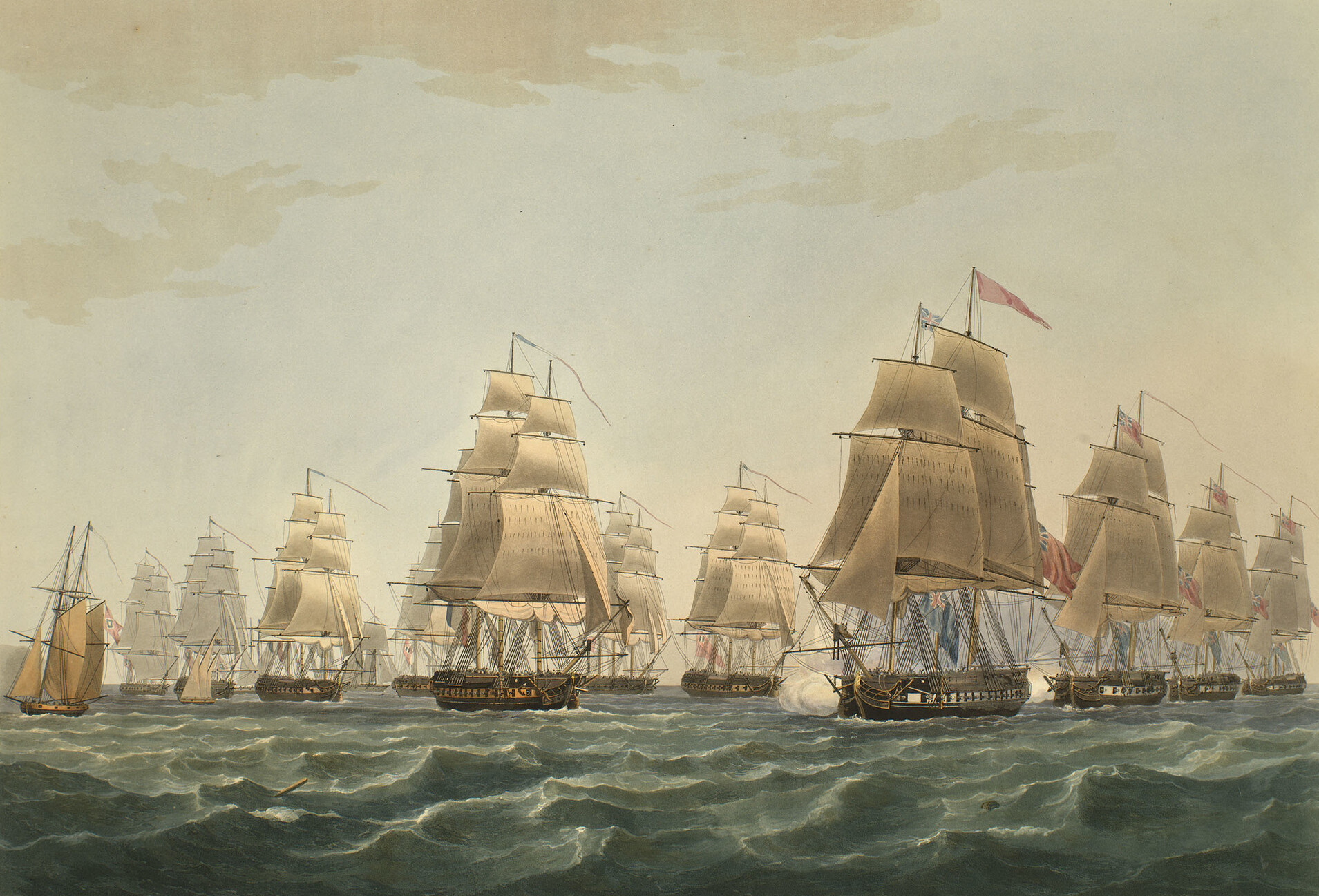
- Favorite (centre-left) at the Battle of Lissa in 1811

History

Kingdom of Italy
- Name: Favorita
- Builder: Venice
- Launched: 1810
- Out of service: 14 June 1810
- Fate: Transferred to France

France
- Name: Favorite
- Namesake: Favourite
- Acquired: 14 June 1810
- Fate: Destroyed 13 March 1811

General characteristics
- Class & type: Pallas-class frigate
- Displacement: 1,080 tonnes
- Length: 46.93 m (154 ft 0 in)
- Beam: 11.91 m (39 ft 1 in)
- Draught: 5.9 m (19 ft 4 in)
- Propulsion: 1,950 m^{2} (21,000 sq ft) of sail
- Complement: 326
- Armament: Nominally 40 guns; In practice carried either 44 or 46 guns: Battery: 28 18-pounders; Quarterdeck & forecastle: 8 × 8-pounder long guns; 8 × 36-pounder carronades or 12 × 18-pounder carronades

Favorite was a 44-gun Pallas-class frigate Favorita of the navy of the Kingdom of Italy. The Italians exchanged her to the French Navy for the three brigs Cyclope, Écureuil and Mercure.

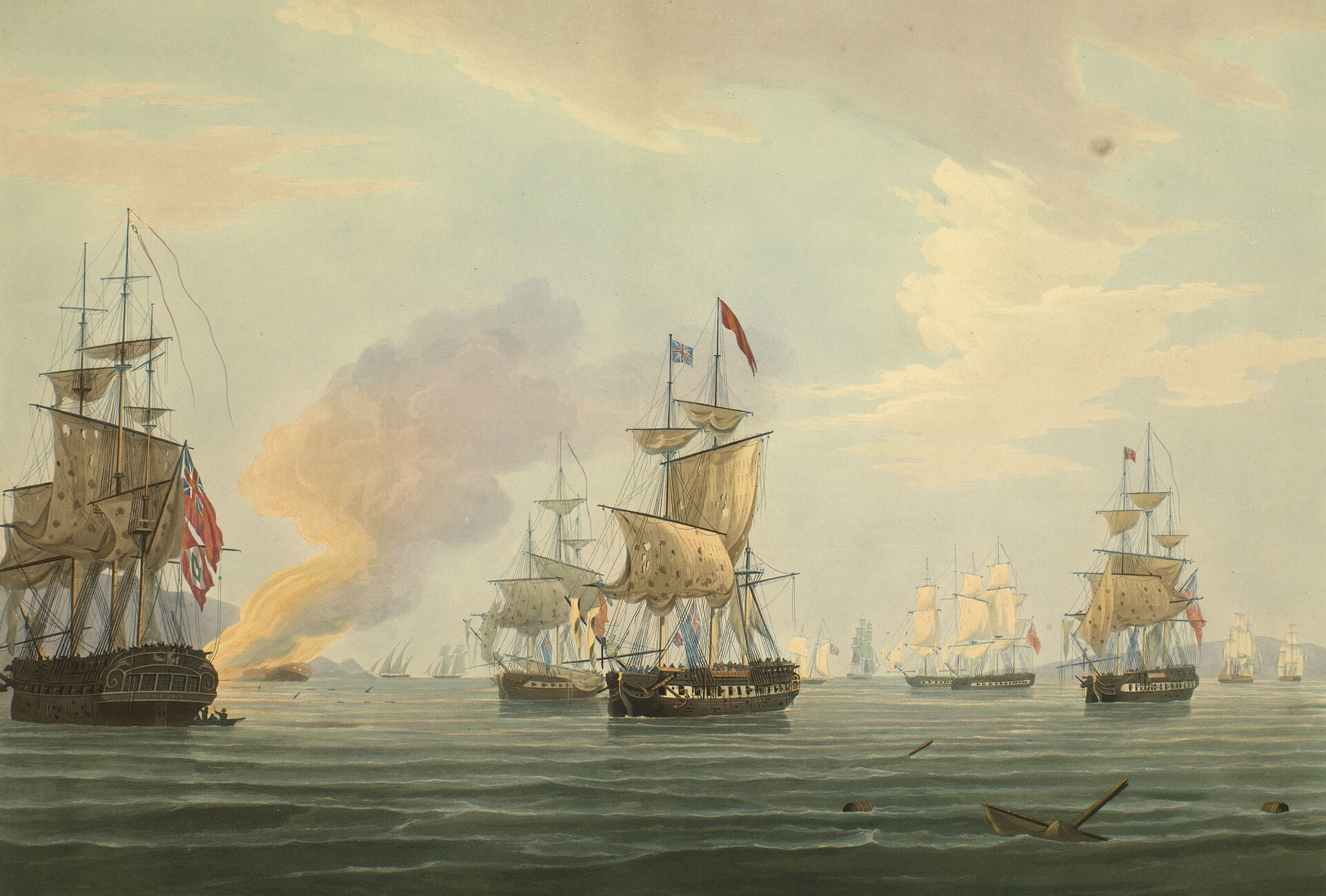
Favorite (second from left) on fire at the Battle of Lissa, 1811

== Career ==
On 12 March 1811, Favorite, under Bernard Dubourdieu, led a frigate squadron to raid the British commerce raider base of the island of Lissa. The squadron encountered William Hoste's frigate squadron, leading to the Battle of Lissa.

In the ensuing fight, Favorite attempted to board the British flagship HMS Amphion, distancing herself from the rest of her squadron. As the two ships neared, Amphion discharged a howitzer full of bullets which rendered a large number of the French casualties. Dubourdieu himself was killed at 9:10. Favorite's first officer and second officers were killed as they attempted again to board Amphion. As she sailed around Amphion in an attempt to rake her and take her in a crossfire with the other French frigates, Favorite was outmanoeuvred and ran aground.

Her crew set her on fire, and she exploded as the battle was still ongoing. Led by colonel Gifflinga, the crew of Favorite captured a coastal boat at Port St George which they used to flee to Lessina.
