= French frigate Danaé (1807) =

Coordinates: 45°37′0.54″N 13°45′59.91″E

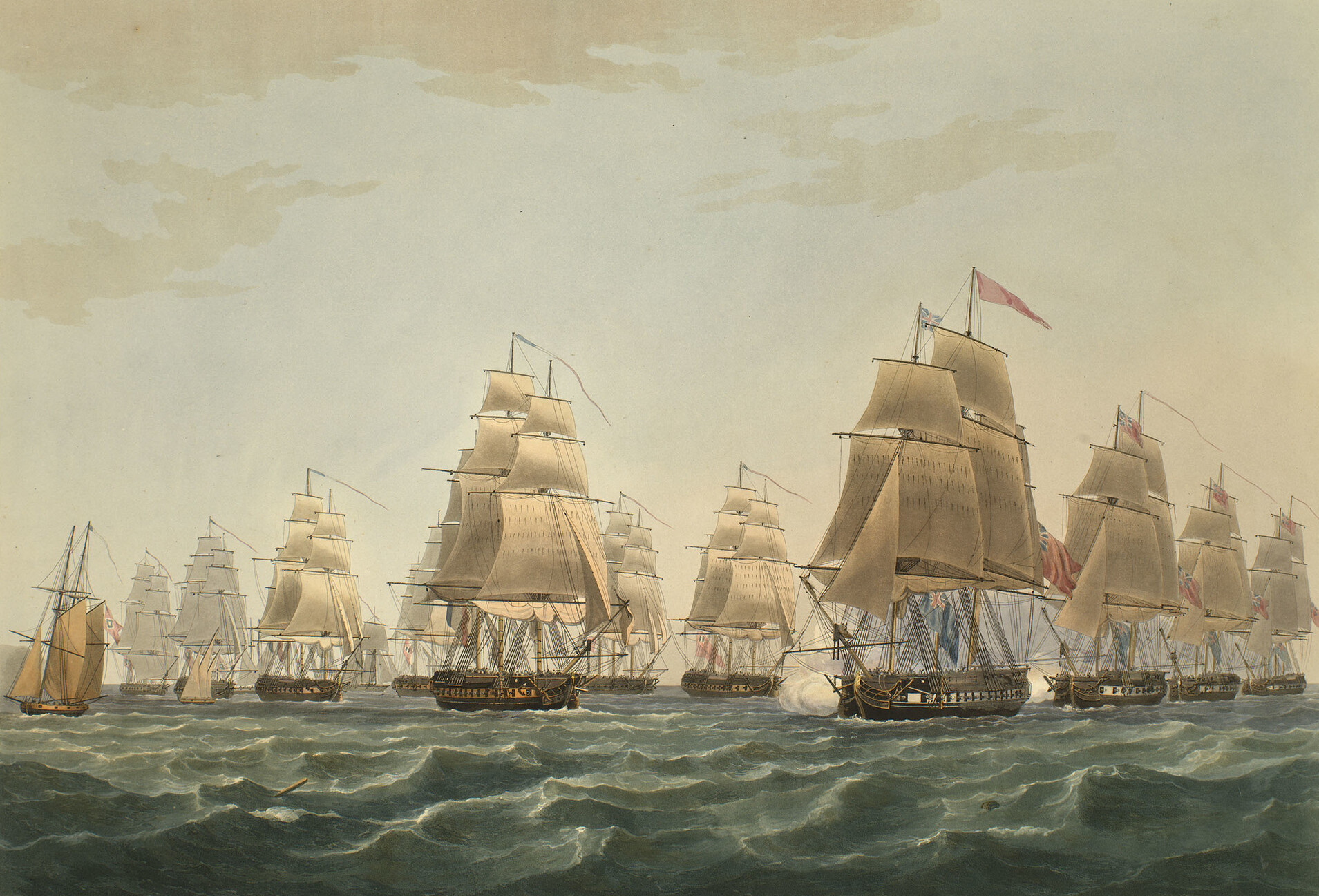
- Danaé (centre-left) at the Battle of Lissa in 1811

History

France
- Name: Danaé
- Namesake: Danaë
- Ordered: January 1805
- Builder: Genoa - Foce, plans by Jacques-Noël Sané
- Laid down: October 1805
- Launched: 18 August 1807
- Acquired: 14 June 1810
- Stricken: 12 March 1811
- Fate: Destroyed by explosion 4 September 1812

General characteristics
- Class & type: Consolante-class frigate
- Displacement: 1320 tonnes
- Tons burthen: 109183/94 (bm)
- Length: 48.75 metres (159.9 ft)
- Beam: 12.2 metres (40 ft)
- Draught: 5.9 metres (19 ft)
- Propulsion: Sail
- Armament: Gun deck: 28 × 18-pounder long guns Quarterdeck and forecastle: 12 × 8-pounder long guns

Danaé was a 44-gun Consolante-class frigate of the French Navy. On 12 March 1811, she was part of Bernard Dubourdieu's squadron sailing to raid the British commerce raider base of the island of Lissa. The squadron encountered William Hoste's frigate squadron, leading to the Battle of Lissa. Danaé was damaged by HMS Volage and had to retreat to Lesina for repairs. In the night of 4 September 1812, she exploded in the harbour of Trieste.

== Sources ==
- Roche, Jean-Michel (2005). Dictionnaire des bâtiments de la flotte de guerre française de Colbert à nos jours 1671 - 1870. Vol. 1. p. 262. ISBN 978-2-9525917-0-6. OCLC 165892922.
