= HMS Ajax (1809) =

Vengeur-class ship of the line

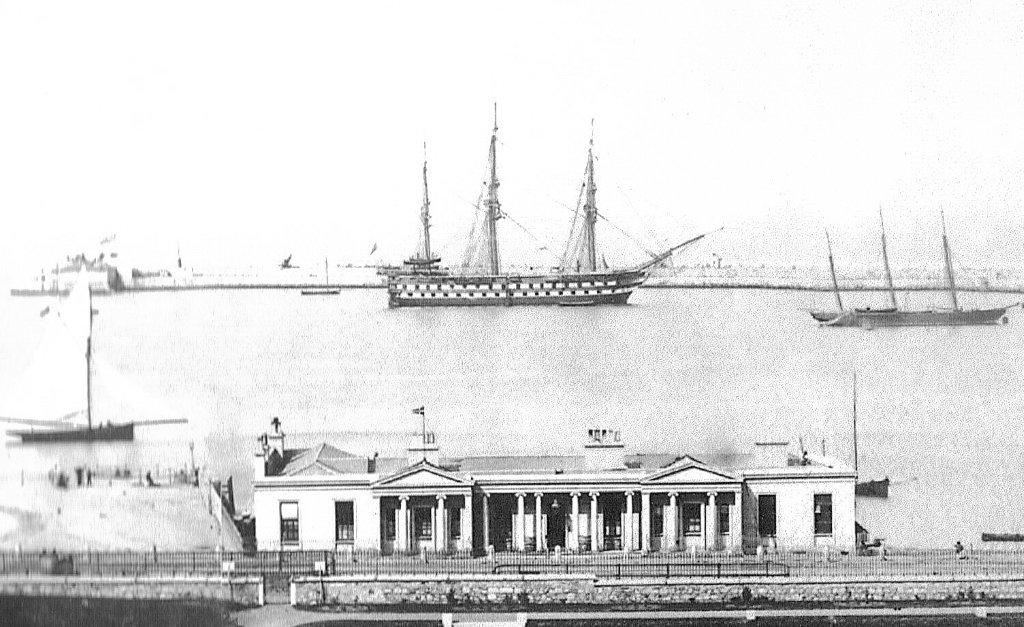
- Ajax as guardship at Kingstown (Dún Laoghaire)

History

United Kingdom
- Name: Ajax
- Ordered: 1 July 1807
- Builder: Perry, Wells & Green, Blackwall Yard
- Laid down: August 1807
- Launched: 2 May 1809
- Commissioned: June 1809
- Decommissioned: 31 March 1864
- Fate: Broken up, 1864

General characteristics (as built)
- Class & type: Vengeur-class ship of the line
- Tons burthen: 1,761 (bm)
- Length: 176 ft (53.6 m) (gundeck)
- Beam: 47 ft 9 in (14.6 m)
- Draught: 17 ft 4 in (5.3 m) (light)
- Depth of hold: 21 ft (6.4 m)
- Sail plan: Full-rigged ship
- Complement: 590
- Armament: 74 muzzle-loading, smoothbore guns; Gundeck: 28 × 32 pdr guns; Upper deck: 28 × 18 pdr guns; Quarterdeck: 4 × 12 pdr guns + 10 × 32 pdr carronades; Forecastle: 2 × 12 pdr guns + 2 × 32 pdr carronades

HMS Ajax was a 74-gun third rate Vengeur-class ship of the line built for the Royal Navy in the first decade of the 19th century. Completed in 1809, she played a minor role in the Napoleonic Wars.

launched on 2 May 1809 at Blackwall Yard.

== Napoleonic Wars ==
On 13 December 350 sailors and 250 marines from the 74-gun third rates Ajax, Cambrian and Kent attacked Palamós. (The sloops Sparrowhawk and Minstrel covered the landing.) The landing party destroyed six of eight merchant vessels with supplies for the French army at Barcelona, as well as their escorts, a national ketch of 14 guns and 60 men and two xebecs of three guns and thirty men each. The vessels were lying inside the mole under the protection of 250 French troops, a battery of two 24-pounders, and a 13" mortar in a battery on a commanding height. Although the attack was successful, the withdrawal was not. The British lost 33 men killed, 89 wounded, and 86 taken prisoner, plus one seaman who took the opportunity to desert.

On 31 March 1811, Ajax and HMS Unite encountered a French squadron comprising the frigates Adrienne and Amélie, and the armed transport French corvette Dromadaire. Ajax captured Dromadaire, while the frigates managed to escape to Portoferraio. Captain Otway of Ajax reported that Dromadaire was frigate-built and sailed remarkably well. Her cargo consisted of 15,000 shot and shells of various sizes and 90 tons of gunpowder. Apparently Napoleon Bonaparte intended them as a present for Hammuda ibn Ali, the Bey of Tunis. Admiral Sir Charles Cotton, commander in chief of the British Mediterranean Fleet, decided to buy her and her stores for the Royal Navy.

On 17 March 1814, Ajax captured the French 16-gun brig Alcyon near the Lizard. Alcyon was armed with sixteen 24-pounder carronades, and had a crew of 120 men. She was provisioned for a four-month cruise, but was only 24 hours out of Saint-Malo when Ajax captured her.

== Post-war ==
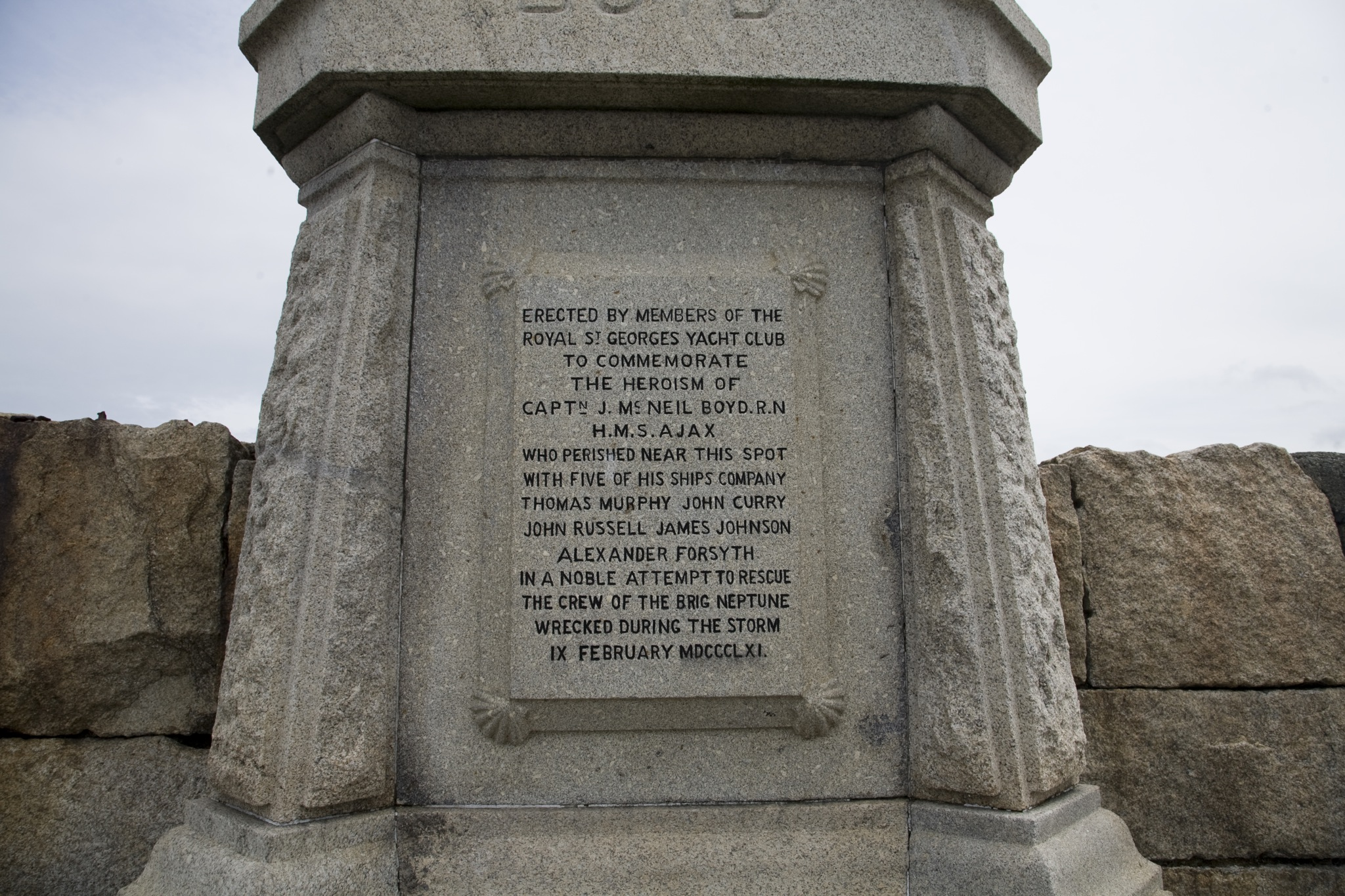
Monument, in Dún Laoghaire, to Captain Boyd and five crew of the Ajax.

Ajax was converted to a blockship with screw propulsion for coastal defence (also called 'steam-guard-ships') in 1846. The conversion process involved removing her copper, ballast and some of the bulkheads, and cutting her down in the shape of a blockship.

From 1846 until 1853 she was stationed as a guardship in Queenstown, now Cobh.

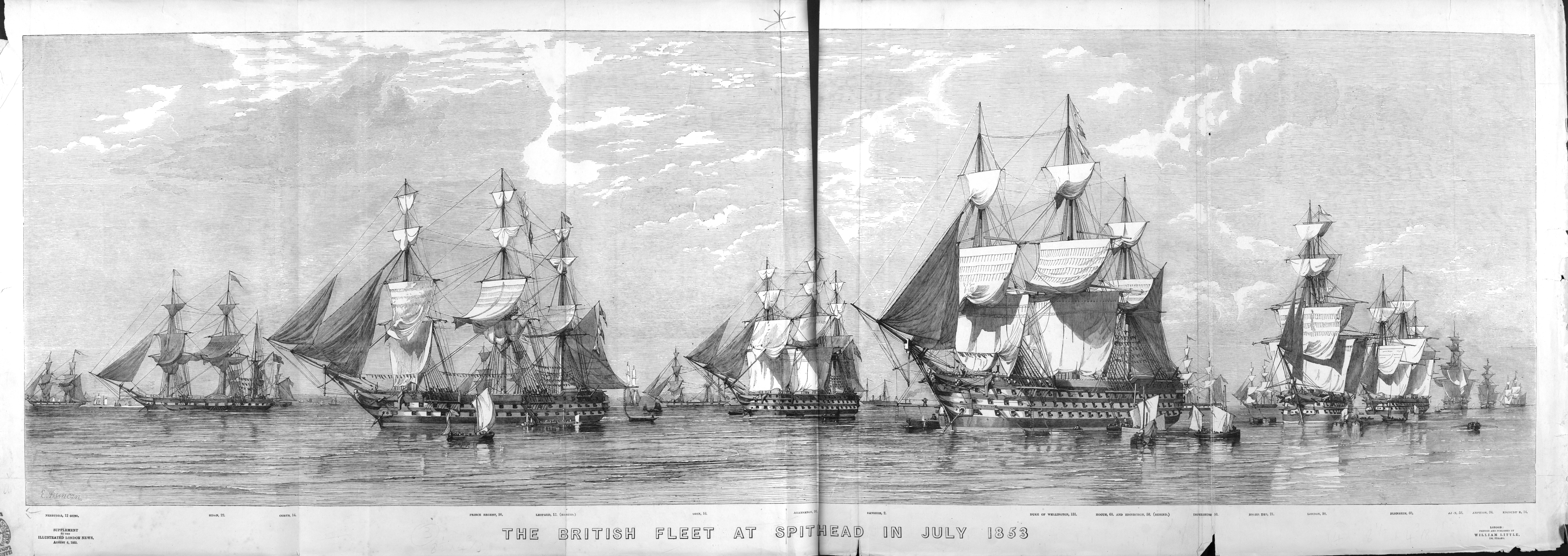
Ajax at the Spithead Fleet Review on 15 July 1853

She took part in the Crimean War 1853–1856. In 1854 she was involved in the Bombardment of Bomarsund, Finland. In 1858 she resumed guardship duties, this time in Kingstown, now Dún Laoghaire, where she remained until 1864 when she was decommissioned and broken up.

Captain John McNeil Boyd R.N. was master of the Ajax while she was in Dún Laoghaire. On 8 February 1861 there was the worst storm in memory. 29 ships were lost between Wicklow Head and Howth Head, all close to Dún Laoghaire. Boyd organised rescues, but he and five of his crew were lost. Fifteen surviving members of the Ajax crew were decorated for bravery and most were promoted. There are many memorials to Boyd and his men. On 3 December 1863. Ajax was driven ashore at Kingstown. She was refloated.

It was announced in February 1864 that the Royal George would replace her as the Coast-guard ship at Kingstown. Ajax arrived at Devonport on 22 March, with her crew to be transferred to Royal George, and was decommissioned on 31 March.

== Fate ==
Ajax was towed to Keyham basin on 28 February 1865 to be "cleared out", and then to Plymouth on 28 March for breaking up at Mr Marshall's yard.
