= Murray Maxwell =

Royal Navy officer (1775–1831)

Captain Sir Murray Maxwell CB FRS
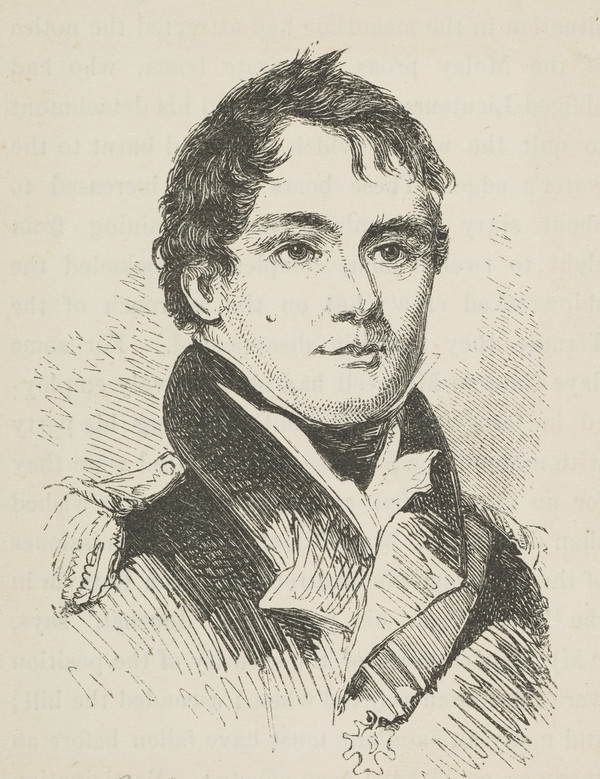
- 1817 portrait
- Born: 10 September 1775; Wigtownshire, Scotland
- Died: 26 June 1831 (aged 55); Lincoln's Inn Fields, London
- Military career
- Allegiance: Great Britain; United Kingdom
- Branch: Royal Navy
- Service years: 1790–1831
- Rank: Captain
- Conflicts: French Revolutionary Wars; Siege of Toulon; Invasion of Corsica (1794); Siege of Bastia; Napoleonic Wars; Invasion of Surinam (1804); Atlantic campaign of 1806; Action of 4 April 1808; Adriatic campaign of 1807–1814; Action of 29 November 1811
- Awards: Knight Bachelor; Companion of the Order of the Bath

Captain Sir Murray Maxwell, CB, FRS (10 September 1775 – 26 June 1831) was a Royal Navy officer who served in the French Revolutionary and Napoleonic Wars. Maxwell first gained recognition in the British navy during the successful Adriatic campaign of 1807–1814, during which he destroyed a French supply convoy during the action of 29 November 1811. As a result of achieving further victories in the Mediterranean, Maxwell was given increasingly important positions and, despite losing the frigate HMS Daedalus off British Ceylon in 1813, was appointed to escort ambassador Lord Amherst to China in 1816.

The voyage to China went awry when Maxwell's ship HMS Alceste wrecked in the Gaspar Strait, and he and his crew became stranded on a nearby island. The shipwrecked crew of Alceste ran low on supplies and were repeatedly attacked by Malay pirates, but thanks to Maxwell's leadership suffered no deaths. Eventually rescued by a brig of the East India Company, the party returned to Britain as heroes, with Maxwell being especially commended. He was knighted for his services, and made a brief and unsuccessful foray into politics before resuming his naval career. In 1831 Maxwell was appointed the Lieutenant Governor of Prince Edward Island, but fell ill and died before he could take up the post.

== Early career ==
Murray Maxwell was born on 10 September 1775 to James and Elizabeth Maxwell. His father was an officer in the British Army's 42nd Regiment of Foot and the son of politician Sir Alexander Maxwell. The family lived in Penninghame in Wigtownshire, Scotland, and Murray was intended for the armed forces from an early age: six of Murray's eight brothers would also join the Army or Navy. In 1790, at the age of 14, he was sent to sea on board HMS Juno, then commanded by Samuel Hood. He had been in Juno for three years when the French Revolutionary Wars broke out, and was on board when the frigate was forced to make a desperate escape from Toulon harbour under heavy fire from French Republican batteries during their siege of Toulon. Later that year, he was involved in the British invasion of Corsica, including the siege of Bastia during which he made such a favourable impression that when Hood transferred to HMS Aigle in 1794, he requested that Maxwell accompany him. Maxwell was transferred again during 1794, this time to the small frigate HMS Nemesis under the command of Hood's relative Captain Samuel Hood Linzee.

In December 1795 Maxwell was taken prisoner when Nemesis was captured by a superior French force in Smyrna harbour. Despite Smyrna's neutrality, the large French frigate Sensible and the smaller corvette Sardine entered the port, followed later by the corvette Rossignol, and called on Nemesis to surrender. Linzee protested at the illegal nature of the French demands, but decided it would be futile to engage the significantly stronger force inside a neutral harbour, and complied with the French order. Maxwell was rapidly exchanged, and returned to service aboard HMS Hussar under Captain James Colnett. However, on 27 December 1796, Hussar was wrecked off Southern France, and Maxwell once again became a prisoner of war. Exchanged a second time, he joined HMS Blenheim, and later moved to HMS Princess Royal, before being made lieutenant in October 1796. Following his promotion, Maxwell was not employed at sea again until 1802. In 1798 he married the daughter of an army officer, Grace Callander Waugh.

== Napoleonic Wars ==
After Britain declared war on France in 1803, initiating the Napoleonic Wars, Maxwell returned to active service in command of the sloop-of-war HMS Cyane. Within days of war start, Cyane captured two French transports destined for the Caribbean, and later served in the West Indies, on one occasion exchanging fire with two large French frigates off Martinique. In 1803, Maxwell was involved in the capture of St Lucia, for which he was made captain of the ship of the line HMS Centaur—the flagship of his former commander Sir Samuel Hood. In this ship Maxwell participated in the capture of the French and Batavian colonies of Tobago, Demerera and Essequibo in 1803, following which his promotion to post-captain was confirmed. He also blockaded Martinique, and was subsequently involved in the British operation which occupied Diamond Rock, overseeing the construction of a gun battery on its summit. This fortified position was able to severely restrict French shipping from entering or leaving Fort-de-France.

In 1804, Maxwell participated in the capture of the Batavian colonies of Surinam and Berbice, and was the most senior naval officer present at the surrender of Surinam. During the invasion of Surinam, his command over the British naval forces present and capture of a succession of Batavian forts along the Suriname River were highly commended. Maxwell's decisive leadership was essential in the rapid movement of British troops over water to prevent the Batavian defenders from preparing fresh defensive positions; the colony surrendered after the British reached Paramaribo, resulting in the capture of 2,000 prisoners, several ships and large quantities of supplies. British losses during the invasion numbered less than 30.

=== Mediterranean service ===
In 1805 Maxwell took command of the frigate HMS Galatea off Jamaica, participating in the Atlantic campaign of 1806 as part of the squadron under Rear-Admiral Sir Alexander Cochrane that drove off a French attack on the Jamaica convoy near Tortola on 4 July 1806. In 1807, Maxwell was transferred to the Mediterranean in HMS Alceste. He was initially part of a raiding squadron that attacked coastal batteries and other positions along the Spanish coast as part of the war between Britain and Spain. On 8 April 1808, shortly before Spain allied with Britain, he destroyed a Spanish convoy carrying military stores off Rota. Over the next two years Maxwell became an expert at raiding the French, Italian and Spanish coasts, destroying numerous Italian Martello towers and small armed vessels. In May 1810 he was commended for a raid at Frejus, where he led a landing party that stormed and destroyed a coastal fort and seized a coastal convoy.

=== Adriatic campaign ===
Maxwell's most notable service came during the Adriatic campaign of 1807–1814. Alceste was despatched to the Adriatic Sea to support James Brisbane in the absence of William Hoste, who had been wounded at the Battle of Lissa in March 1811. On 4 May, Maxwell and Brisbane led an attack on Parenza, where a brig carrying supplies to Ragusa had taken shelter. Seizing an island at the mouth of the harbour, the British established a mortar position overlooking the anchorage, and sank the brig with a heavy bombardment. In November 1811, with the temporary absence of Brisbane, Maxwell became the senior officer in the Adriatic. Seven months later, a convoy of French frigates carrying cannon from Corfu to Trieste was spotted attempting to slip past his base of operations on the island of Lissa. Ashore in Port St. George, Maxwell was informed by telegraph, and led Alceste and the rest of his squadron—HMS Active and HMS Unite—in pursuit.

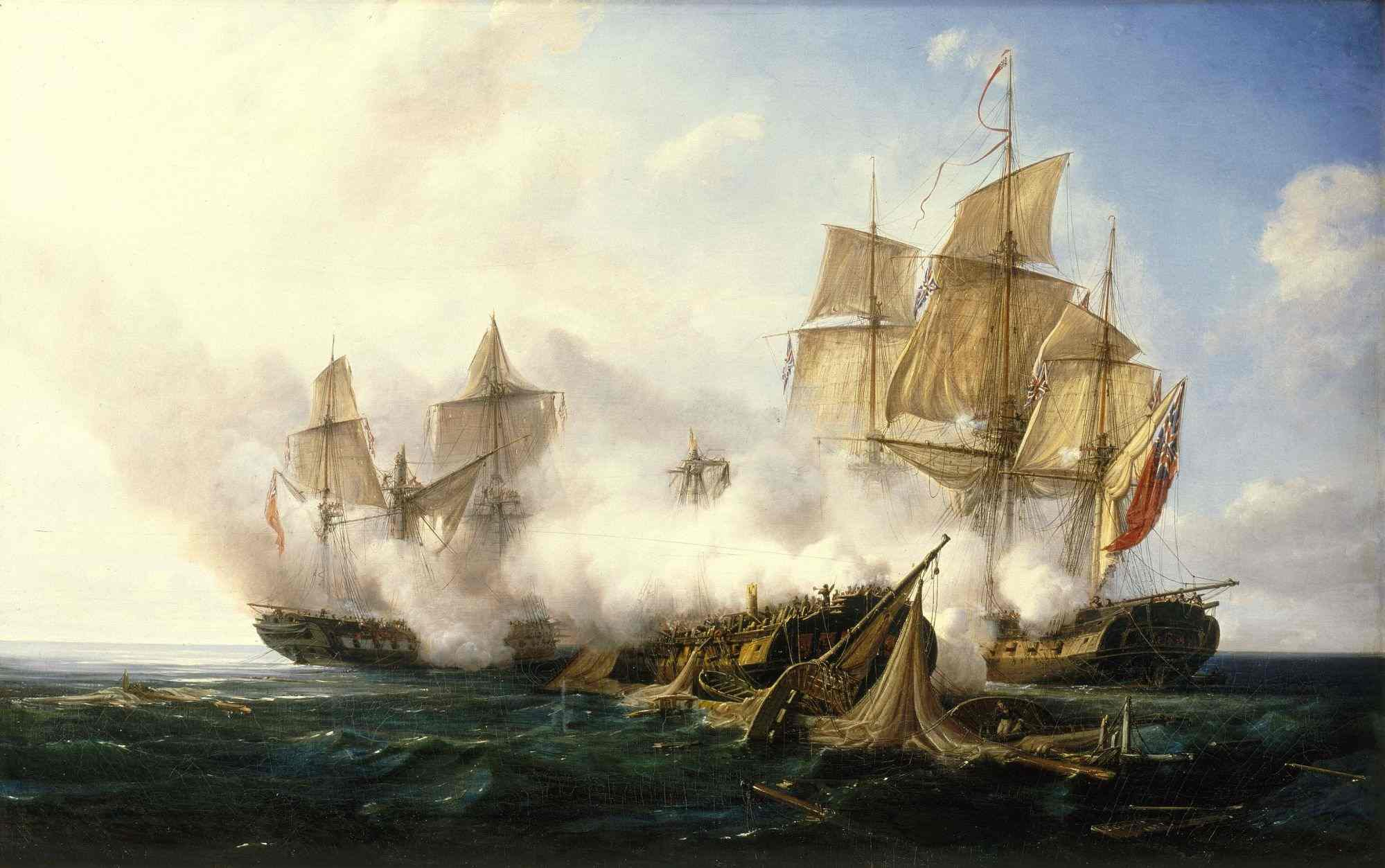
The action of 29 November 1811, at which Maxwell captured Pomone

On 29 November, after a night's chase, the British caught their opponents near Pelagosa. The French force consisted of the large frigates Pauline and Pomone, and the armed storeship Persanne. In the ensuing battle Unite pursued and after a lengthy chase captured the smaller Persanne, while Maxwell and James Alexander Gordon in Active engaged the French frigates. The action was bitterly contested, the British taking 61 casualties, including Gordon who lost a leg. However, Alceste and Active successfully isolated Pomone, and when another British ship, HMS Kingfisher, appeared in the distance, Pauline fled. Alone and having lost heavily, Pomone surrendered. The prizes were later sold along with their cargo of 200 cannon. Maxwell, despite attributing most of the credit for the victory to the wounded Gordon, was rewarded in 1812 with command of HMS Daedalus, a former Italian frigate captured at the Battle of Lissa.

=== HMS Daedalus ===
Maxwell commanded Daedalus for less than a year. On 2 July 1813 the frigate ran aground on a shoal off Galle, Ceylon, causing serious damage to her keel. Although she was soon brought off, the leaks created in the grounding became so severe that Maxwell had no option but to order his crew to cease their desperate attempts to keep her afloat and abandon ship. He was the last to leave and shortly after he had been transported to a nearby East Indiaman, Daedalus rolled over and sank. Maxwell returned to Britain to face a court-martial but was exonerated for the frigate's loss and reappointed to Alceste. In 1815 he was made a Companion of the Order of the Bath for his naval service, and although the war against France had ended, was retained for active duty at the special request of Lord Amherst.

== Voyage to China and shipwreck ==
In 1816 Maxwell was ordered to escort Lord Amherst on a diplomatic mission to the Jiaqing Emperor of China. Alceste was accompanied by the small sloop HMS Lyra, under Captain Basil Hall, and the East Indiaman General Hewitt, which carried gifts for the Emperor. The small convoy called at Madeira, Rio de Janeiro, Cape Town, Anjere and Batavia, and arrived at Peiho after nearly six months at sea in July. Amherst went ashore with his party, instructing Maxwell to meet him at Canton once his diplomatic mission was complete. The mission was expected to last several months, so Maxwell and Hall agreed to use the time to become the first British sailors to explore the Yellow Sea and beyond. Between them, Lyra and Alceste visited the Gulf of Pecheli, the West coast of Korea and the "Loo-Choo" (Ryukyu) Islands—in some cases as the first European ships known to have sailed these waters. During the journey, Maxwell saw the Great Wall of China and discovered serious inaccuracies in the charts of Western Korea, finding it lay 130 miles east of its supposed position. The expedition also made the first known British government contacts with both the Koreans and the Ryukyu Islanders, who ignored instructions from Chinese officials not to communicate with the British ships.

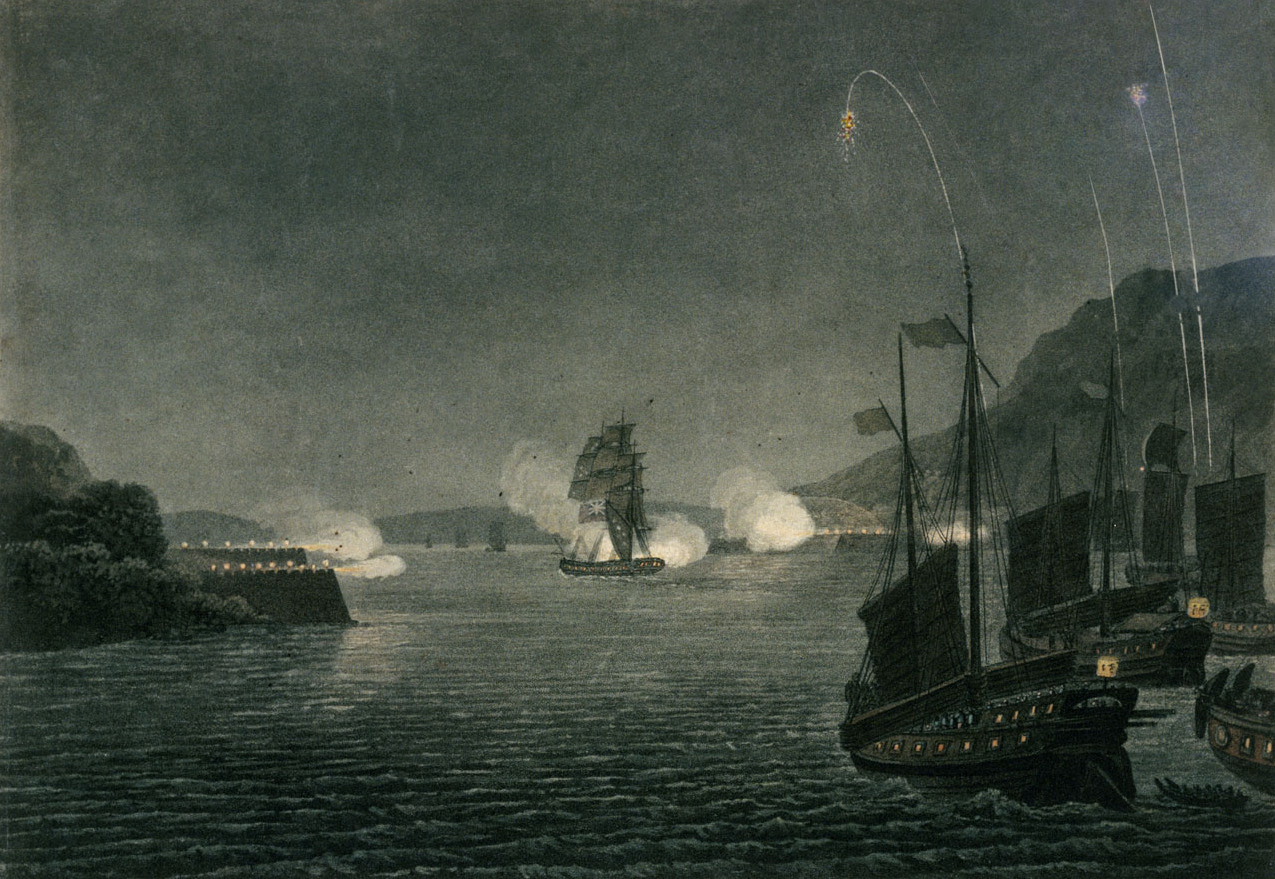
Alceste under Maxwell firing at Chinese forts in the Bocca Tigris in November 1816

Maxwell arrived off the Pearl River in November 1816 and prepared to sail to Whampoa for his reunion with Amherst. Amherst's mission had foundered on the British party's refusal to kowtow to the Jiaqing Emperor and offer him tribute as overlord, and Amherst and his retinue had to retire to Whampoa with their mission incomplete. At the mouth of the Pearl, Alceste was refused permission to enter the river and perfunctorily ordered to halt by a local mandarin, who threatened to sink the frigate if it tried to force passage. Responding angrily that he would pass the river with or without the mandarin's permission, Maxwell attacked the Chinese defences at the Bocca Tigris, breaking through a blockade of junks and firing on the forts guarding the river mouth, scattering their defenders. He sailed on to Whampoa without further impediment, without casualties; Chinese losses were reportedly 47 killed and many wounded. Maxwell himself had fired the first cannon as a statement that he took personal responsibility for the exchange of fire—reportedly, the first cannonball was ironically marked "Tribute from the King of England to the Chinese". Collecting Amherst and his party from Whampoa, Maxwell sailed back down the Pearl River and, in January 1817, began the return journey to Britain, visiting Macao and Manila.

On 18 February 1817 Alceste entered the Gaspar Strait between Bangka and Liat, traversing largely uncharted waters. Some hours later the frigate struck a hidden reef and grounded, sustaining severe damage to her hull. Despite Maxwell's best efforts to free his ship the carpenter reported that Alceste was taking on water and would rapidly sink if refloated. Ordering the ship to be abandoned, Maxwell gave the ship's barge to the ambassador and supervised the construction of a raft which, with the remaining boats, safely convoyed the crew, passengers and a quantity of supplies to a nearby island, formed largely of impenetrable mangrove swamps. The last to leave Alceste, Maxwell arrived on shore on the morning of 19 February. A council of officers subsequently decided that Amherst would take the ship's boats and 50 men and attempt to reach Batavia, four days sail away. It was essential that Amherst reach Batavia quickly, as the supplies salvaged from the wreck, especially of drinkable water, would only last a few days shared among all 250 survivors.

=== Attack by Dayaks ===
To keep up morale following Amherst's departure, Maxwell began organising his remaining 200 men (and one woman) to secure their position and gather supplies. The men were divided into parties, with one ordered to dig a well while another returned to the wreck of Alceste to salvage what weapons and equipment they could. A third party was ordered to clear a path to the island's central hill, where a cool cave could be used as a larder and trees felled to form a protective stockade. By the end of the first day the well was producing a steady supply of water.

The party aboard Alceste, having determined that the ship was in no immediate danger of sinking, decided to remain aboard overnight. However, at dawn they awoke to discover the ship surrounded by Dayak (or Malay) proas armed with swivel guns. The party escaped on the raft, only reaching the island ahead of the pursuing proas with the assistance of boats sent to meet them carrying armed Royal Marines. With the wreck vacated, the Dayaks began enthusiastically looting it and several proas approached the island, landing their crews on offshore rocks to both observe the British and store their salvage. Maxwell hastily organised defensive positions in case the Dayaks attacked the island, completing the stockade on the island's hill and preparing sharpened stakes and hundreds of improvised cartridges for the group's 30 muskets. Over the next few days the proas approached the island several times, but despite attempts by the British to communicate with them, never landed. Eventually, on 22 February, Maxwell took advantage of the divided Dayak positions to drive their observers off the rocks, with the intention of recapturing the wreck. This was initially successful, but the departing Dayaks set fire to Alceste, burning her to the waterline. The destruction of the frigate's upper works exposed her hold, and the next morning the stranded sailors were able to collect some supplies that had floated out.

During the early morning of 26 February, British sentries spotted two proas attempting to land at the cove where the remaining British boats were anchored. Taking one of the boats to intercept the proas, Lieutenant Hay boarded a Dayak canoe and captured it, despite fire from the Dayak guns. Four Dayaks were killed, two captured, and five jumped into the sea and drowned themselves, having scuttled their proa. Later in the day fourteen more proas appeared, led by a large vessel carrying a rajah. These approached the island and several Malays came ashore, a number of British sailors being admitted on board the rajah's canoe in return. The inability of either side to speak the others language hindered negotiations, and the Malays retreated to their boats late in the day. The rajah subsequently directed renewed salvage operations on the wreck, seeking especially the copper nails that had held the ship's beams together. By 2 March there were nearly 30 proas off the island, 20 of which were detached to open an ineffective long-range fire on the British positions ashore, accompanied by frenzied drumming and the bashing of gongs. Although further attempts were made to communicate with the proas, and messages successfully passed to them in the hope someone in authority would transmit them to nearby settlements, the British crew expected an attack at any moment. In preparation, Maxwell gathered his men together and spoke to them:

My lads, you must all have observed the great increase in the enemy's force, and the threatening posture they have assumed. I have reason to believe they will attack us this night. I do not wish to conceal our real state, because I do not believe there is a man here who is afraid to face any sort of danger. We are in a position to defend ourselves against regular troops, far less a set of naked savages, with their spears and krisses. It is true they have swivels in their boats, but they cannot act here. I have not observed that they have any muskets, but if they have, so have we. When we were first thrown on shore we could only muster seventy-five musket ball cartridges—we now have sixteen hundred. They cannot send up, I believe, more than five hundred men; but with two hundred such as now stand around me, I do not fear a thousand—nor fifteen hundred of them. The pikemen standing firm, we will give them such a volley of musketry as they will be little prepared for; and when they are thrown into confusion, we will sally out, chase them into the water, and ten to one but we secure their vessels. let every man be on the alert, and should these barbarians this night attempt our hill, I trust we shall convince them they are dealing with Britons.

So loud was the cheering that followed this address that the proas fell silent, the Dayaks apparently unnerved. In the morning however the 20 canoes were still offshore and, with the anticipated rescue overdue and supplies running low, a desperate plan was made to use the ship's boats to board and capture enough Dayak vessels to enable the entire crew to reach Batavia. However, while these plans were being formed the British East India Company's (EIC) armed brig Ternate appeared on the southern horizon.

=== Napoleon ===
Determined to make one last show of defiance, Maxwell ordered the marines to wade towards the proas at low tide and open fire on them. This achieved no hits, but did persuade the Dayaks to move further offshore, and they departed entirely when the Ternate was spotted. The following day the survivors embarked on board Ternate, Maxwell having lost not one man on either the shipwreck or the island. At Batavia the crew were reunited with Amherst and his party, who had sent Ternate to search for them and subsequently chartered the East Indiaman Caesar for the remainder of the journey to Britain.

The voyage to Europe remained eventful. In the Indian Ocean Caesar caught fire and was almost destroyed, and after stopping at Cape Town, the Indiaman visited St Helena, where Amherst, Maxwell and the other officers were introduced to the former French emperor Napoleon Bonaparte, then a prisoner on the island. At the meeting Bonaparte recalled Maxwell's conduct in the action of November 1811 and commended him on his victory, saying "Vous êtes très méchant. Eh bien! Your government must not blame you for the loss of the Alceste, for you have taken one of my frigates".

== Later service ==
c. 1818 portrait of Maxwell by Richard Dighton

Returning to Britain in August 1817, where the story of his shipwreck and subsequent difficulties had become headline news, Maxwell was widely praised for his leadership. In the court-martial convened to investigate the incident he was exonerated of all blame, and especially commended for his calm and authoritative control of the situation. Chief among the witnesses on his behalf was Lord Amherst himself. The court martial reported that "his coolness, self-collectedness and exertions were highly conspicuous, and everything was done by him and his officers within the power of man to execute". The following year he was knighted, and in 1819 made a Fellow of the Royal Society. That same year the HEIC presented him with £1,500 as a reward for his services in China and to compensate him for his financial losses in the wreck. An account of the Yellow Sea voyage by Basil Hall was published in 1818 under the title "Account of a Voyage of Discovery to the West Coast of Corea and the Great Loo-Choo Islands". The book was dedicated to Sir Murray Maxwell, and proved popular.

Maxwell stood in the 1818 general election, seeking to become Member of Parliament for Westminster. He was narrowly defeated by less than 400 votes, losing to Sir Samuel Romilly and Sir Francis Burdett. The campaign ruined him financially, and after a "severe personal injury" in Covent Garden when he was struck in the back by a paving stone thrown from a mob opposed to his candidacy, he was left with disgust for the political process. Maxwell's lungs were badly damaged; he never fully recovered from the injury, and never again became involved in politics, instead returning to the Navy in 1821 as captain of HMS Bulwark, the flagship of Admiral Sir Benjamin Hallowell at Chatham. The same year, the Arctic explorer Henry Parkyns Hoppner, who had served under Maxwell aboard the Alceste on the mission to China, named Murray Maxwell Bay on Baffin Island after his former captain.

By 1823 Maxwell was in command of HMS Gloucester organising operations against smugglers, and later in the year he was given a foreign posting in command of HMS Briton off South America. Here he observed the Peruvian War of Independence and was present at the surrender of Callao, forming a friendship with the defeated General Rodil. This posting proved a frustrating experience for Maxwell, who broke his kneecap on the outward journey and never fully recovered use of the limb. He also failed to gain any of the financial rewards that overseas postings could bring, and was unable to restore his shattered finances, returning a poorer man than when he had left.

Still feeling the chest injury sustained during the 1818 election, Maxwell returned to Britain in 1826 and entered retirement; during this period he also reportedly had a bout of depression, especially following the sudden death of his youngest daughter in 1827. In 1830, he was recalled by the newly crowned King William IV. A former naval officer himself, King William selected a number of senior Navy officers to be his aides de camp, including Maxwell, who was subsequently appointed to succeed John Ready as Lieutenant Governor of Prince Edward Island on 14 March 1831. As Maxwell sailed from his home in Scotland to London to make preparations for his departure, he was suddenly taken ill. Medical assistance was unavailable for 48 hours during the passage, and the weather too rough for him to go ashore in an open boat in his condition. As a result, Maxwell died shortly after arriving at Green's Hotel in Lincoln's Inn Fields, London; Colonel Aretas William Young took his place as governor. Maxwell was buried at St Marylebone Parish Church, and was survived by his wife and their son John Balfour Maxwell, who died in 1874 as an admiral of the Royal Navy.

== Notes ==
Political offices
Preceded by John Ready	Lieutenant Governor of Prince Edward Island; 1831	Succeeded by Aretas William Young
