= François-Gilles Montfort =

François-Gilles Montfort (French pronunciation: [fʁɑ̃swa ʒil mɔ̃fɔʁ]; Saint-Malo, 16 January 1769 - Marseille, 25 March 1826) was a French naval officer.

== Career ==
In 1803 lieutenant de vaisseau François-Gilles Montfort was captain of the gunbrig Venteux. On 27 June boats from HMS Loire captured Venteux at the Île de Batz, where she was sheltering under the guns of shore batteries. The British boarded her, and though outnumbered, in a fierce 10-minute struggle succeeded in taking her over. British casualties were six men wounded, one seriously and two mortally. French casualties were three men killed, one of them her second captain. Venteux also had Montfort, her four remaining officers, and eight seamen wounded.

As captain of the 44-gun frigate Pauline, Montfort took part in the action of 27 February 1809.

In 1811, Montfort was put in charge of a frigate squadron comprising Pauline, Pomone and Persanne, with his flag on Pauline. The ships were to ferry artillery equipment from Corfu to Trieste. The squadron met with a British squadron under Murray Maxwell, resulting in the action of 29 November 1811 in which Pomone and Persanne were captured. Montfort faced court-martial for the loss of the two ships under his command. For his failure to support these ships, his conduct was deemed cowardly, and he was relieved of command.

== Sources and references ==
=== Bibliography ===
- Roche, Jean-Michel (2005). Dictionnaire des bâtiments de la flotte de guerre française de Colbert à nos jours, 1671 - 1870. Group Retozel-Maury Millau. p. 344. ISBN 978-2-9525917-0-6. OCLC 165892922.
