= Adriatic campaign of 1807–1814 =

Campaign in the Napoleonic Wars

- Part of the Napoleonic Wars
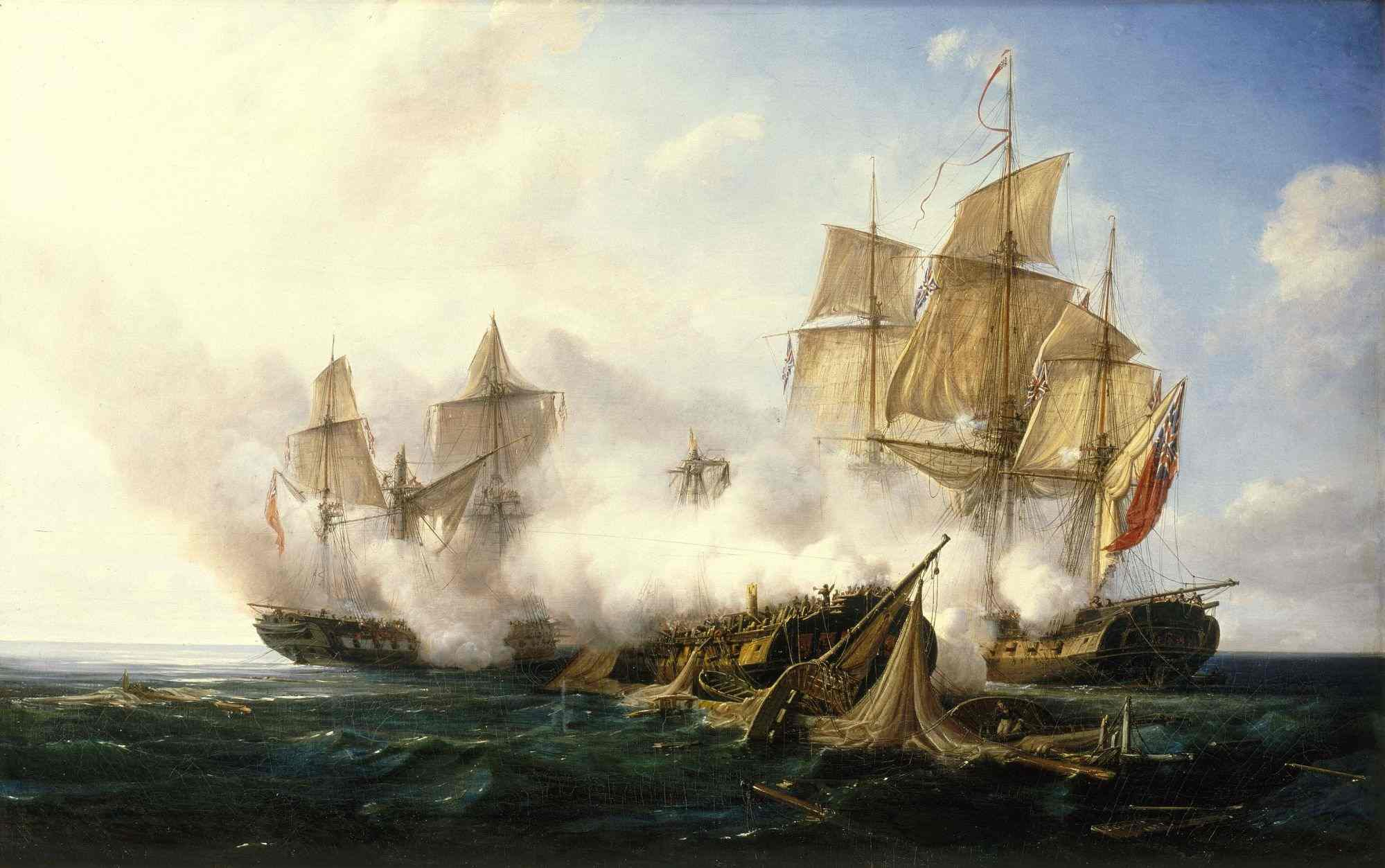
- Painting of the action of 29 November 1811
Date	1807–1814
Location	Adriatic Sea, Mediterranean
Result	Coalition victory

Belligerents
United Kingdom; Austria; Montenegro; Greek irregulars	France; Italy; Naples; Ragusa

Commanders and leaders
(United Kingdom of Great Britain and Ireland) John Oswald (United Kingdom of Great Britain and Ireland) Thomas Fremantle (United Kingdom of Great Britain and Ireland) William Hoste (United Kingdom of Great Britain and Ireland) Murray Maxwell (Prince-Bishopric of Montenegro) Petar I Theodoros Kolokotronis	(First French Empire) Bernard Dubourdieu (French First Republic) François Montford (French First Republic) Jean-Baptiste Barré (French First Republic) Joseph Montrichard

The Adriatic campaign of 1807–1814 was a minor theatre of war of the Napoleonic Wars in which the Royal Navy, assisted by Austrian, Montenegrin and Greek troops, attacked the combined forces of the First French Empire, Kingdom of Italy and Kingdom of Naples in the Adriatic Sea from 1807 to 1814. Much of the region was under direct or indirect French control, coming under France's domination as a result of Treaty of Pressburg which brought an end to the War of the Third Coalition.

Control of the Adriatic brought numerous advantages to the French Navy, allowing rapid transit of troops from Italy to the Balkans and Austria for campaigning in the east and giving France possession of numerous shipbuilding facilities, particularly the large naval yards of Venice. From 1807, when the Treaty of Tilsit precipitated a Russian withdrawal from the Septinsular Republic, the French Navy held naval supremacy in the region. The Treaty of Tilsit also contained a secret clause that guaranteed French assistance in any war fought between the Russians and the Ottoman Empire. To fulfil this clause, Napoleon would have to secure his supply lines to the east by developing the French armies in Illyria. This required control of the Adriatic against increasingly aggressive British raiders. The Royal Navy decided to prevent these troop convoys from reaching Illyria and sought to break French hegemony in the region, resulting in a six-year naval campaign.

The campaign was not uniform in approach; British and French forces were limited by the dictates of the wider Mediterranean and global conflict, and consequently ship numbers fluctuated. Although numerous commanders held commands in the region, the two most important personalities were those of William Hoste and Bernard Dubourdieu, whose exploits were celebrated in their respective national newspapers during 1810 and 1811. The campaign between the two officers reached a climax at the Battle of Lissa in March 1811, when Dubourdieu was killed and his squadron defeated by Hoste in a celebrated action.

The events of 1811 gave the British dominance in the Adriatic for the remainder of the war. British and Greek expeditionary forces steadily captured fortified French islands and their raiding parties inflicted havoc on trade across the region. As a result, French plans against the Ottoman Empire were cancelled, La Grande Armée turning towards Russia. British forces continued operations until the advancing armies of the Sixth Coalition drove the French from the shores of the Adriatic in early 1814, British troops and marines assisting in the capture of several important French cities, including Fiume (Rijeka) and Trieste.

== Background ==
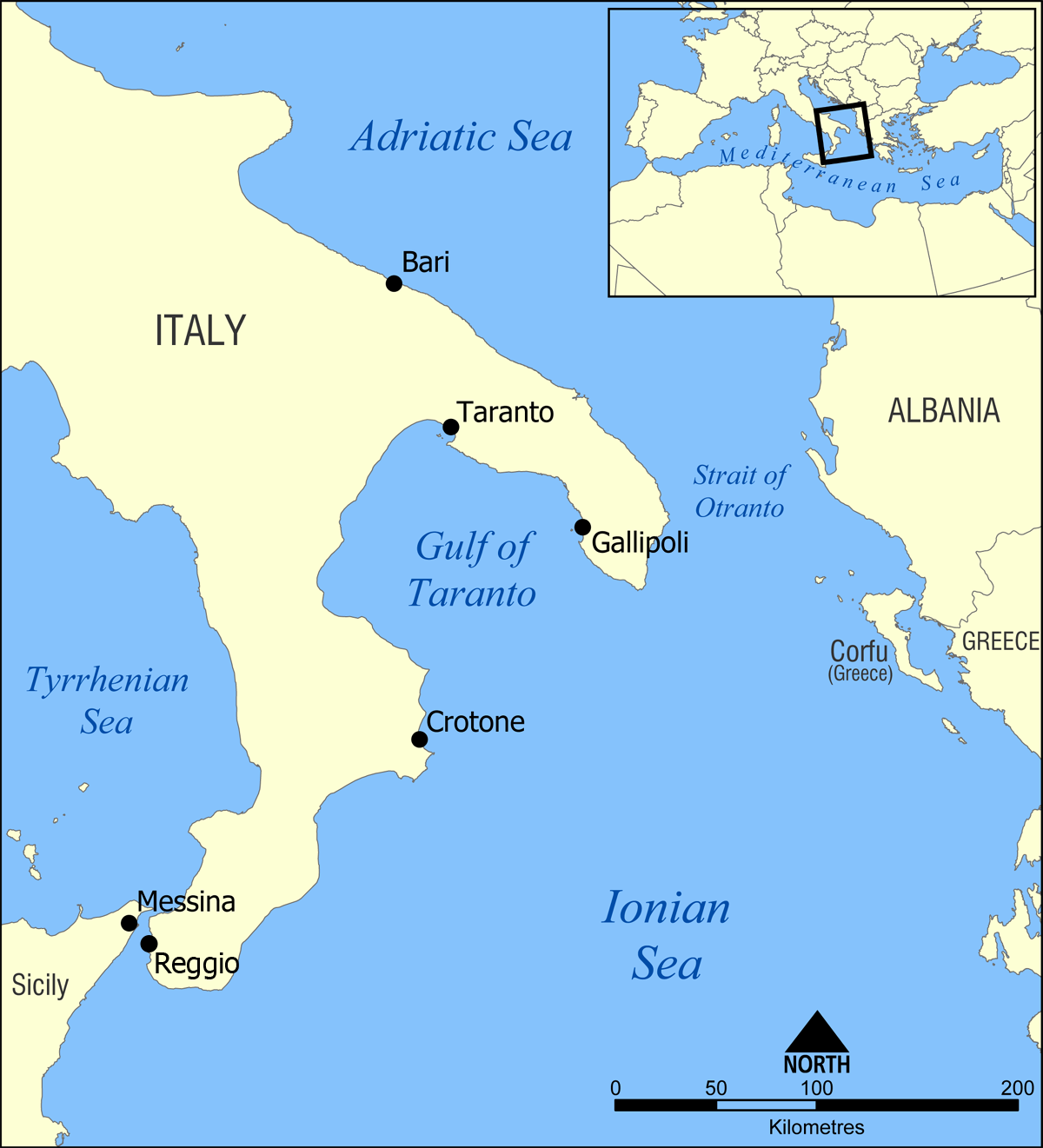
Map illustrating the strategic importance of Corfu in controlling the entrance to the Adriatic.

There had been a French presence in the Adriatic Sea since the Treaty of Campo Formio during the French Revolutionary War. Campo Formio marked the end of the War of the First Coalition in 1797 and confirmed the demise of the independent Republic of Venice and the division of its territory between the French Republic and the Austrian Empire. One of France's gains from this division were the seven Ionian Islands that controlled the entrance to the Adriatic. These French outposts in the Eastern Mediterranean were considered a threat by both the Russian and the Ottoman Empires and in 1798 a united Russo-Ottoman force attacked the massively fortified French citadel on Corfu, which fell the following year after a four-month siege. The victors took possession of the islands and from them created the Septinsular Republic, nominally Ottoman, practically independent and guaranteed by the Russian Navy.

On mainland Europe, the rise of Napoleon Bonaparte as the ruler of the new French Empire resulted in a new conflict, the War of the Third Coalition in 1805, which ended disastrously for the Austrian and Russian allied armies at the Battle of Austerlitz. The treaties that ended the war created two French client monarchies in Italy, the Kingdom of Italy and the Kingdom of Naples, and French troops were left holding substantial parts of the Eastern coastline of the Adriatic in Dalmatia. These holdings significantly increased French naval interest in the Adriatic, which was well supplied with excellent ports and shipbuilding facilities, particularly at Venice.

The Russian garrison on Corfu, augmented with a powerful naval squadron, effectively blocked French use of the Adriatic by sealing the entrance through the Straits of Otranto. French military concerns were also directed further north at this time, resulting in the War of the Fourth Coalition during 1806 and 1807 that saw Napoleon's armies overrun Prussia and force the Russians to sign the Treaty of Tilsit on 7 July 1807. One of the minor clauses of this treaty transferred the Ionian Islands back into French hands, the Russians withdrawing completely from the Adriatic. This withdrawal supported a hidden clause in the treaty that guaranteed French support in the continuing Russian war with the Ottomans in the Balkans.

== Campaign ==
=== Opening exchanges ===
As the Russians withdrew, the French immediately despatched garrisons to the Ionian Islands, rapidly amassing over 7,400 French and Neapolitan troops on Corfu alone. This effectively turned the Adriatic into a sheltered French sea from which they could be free to despatch raiders against British convoys, colonies and Royal Navy blockade squadrons, which had controlled the Mediterranean since the Battle of Trafalgar two years earlier. To facilitate this, the French Navy placed significant orders at the Venetian naval yards, intending to build forces in the region with locally produced and crewed vessels.

The Royal Navy's Mediterranean Fleet responded rapidly to this threat, and in November 1807 the fourth rate ship HMS Glatton and several smaller craft were blockading Corfu, seizing several French and Italian reinforcement convoys. Encouraged by the success of the blockade, small British raiders began entering the Adriatic independently, to prey on French convoys along the Italian coast. One of the first British operations in the region was the seizure of the small Dalmatian Island of Lissa, for use as a safe harbour deep in nominally French-controlled waters. The largely uninhabited island was rapidly developed into an effective naval base with the construction of a town and harbour at Port St. George. During 1807, British ships stationed in the Adriatic were relatively small and their impact was consequently minor. British raiders also limited their attacks on the Illyrian coast to purely military objectives in order to maintain the support of the local population, who supplied the British cruisers with food, water and naval stores. The French Mediterranean Fleet, led by Admiral Ganteaume made a foray to Corfu in February 1808 that the British blockading squadron was powerless to stop, but this was the only attempt by the French to send ships of the line to the region and the fleet had returned to Toulon by mid-March.

The first major British deployment into the Adriatic came in May 1808, when the frigate HMS Unite under Captain Patrick Campbell arrived off Venice. During May, Campbell severely disrupted French and Italian shipping off the busiest Adriatic seaport and captured three ships sent against him by the Italian Navy. The French response to these depredations was to despatch the small frigate Var to Venice, an action which had little effect on British operations. British activity in the Adriatic was however curtailed during the year by the British war with the Ottoman Empire, which absorbed the scant British naval resources in the Eastern Mediterranean.

=== Invasions of the Ionian Islands ===
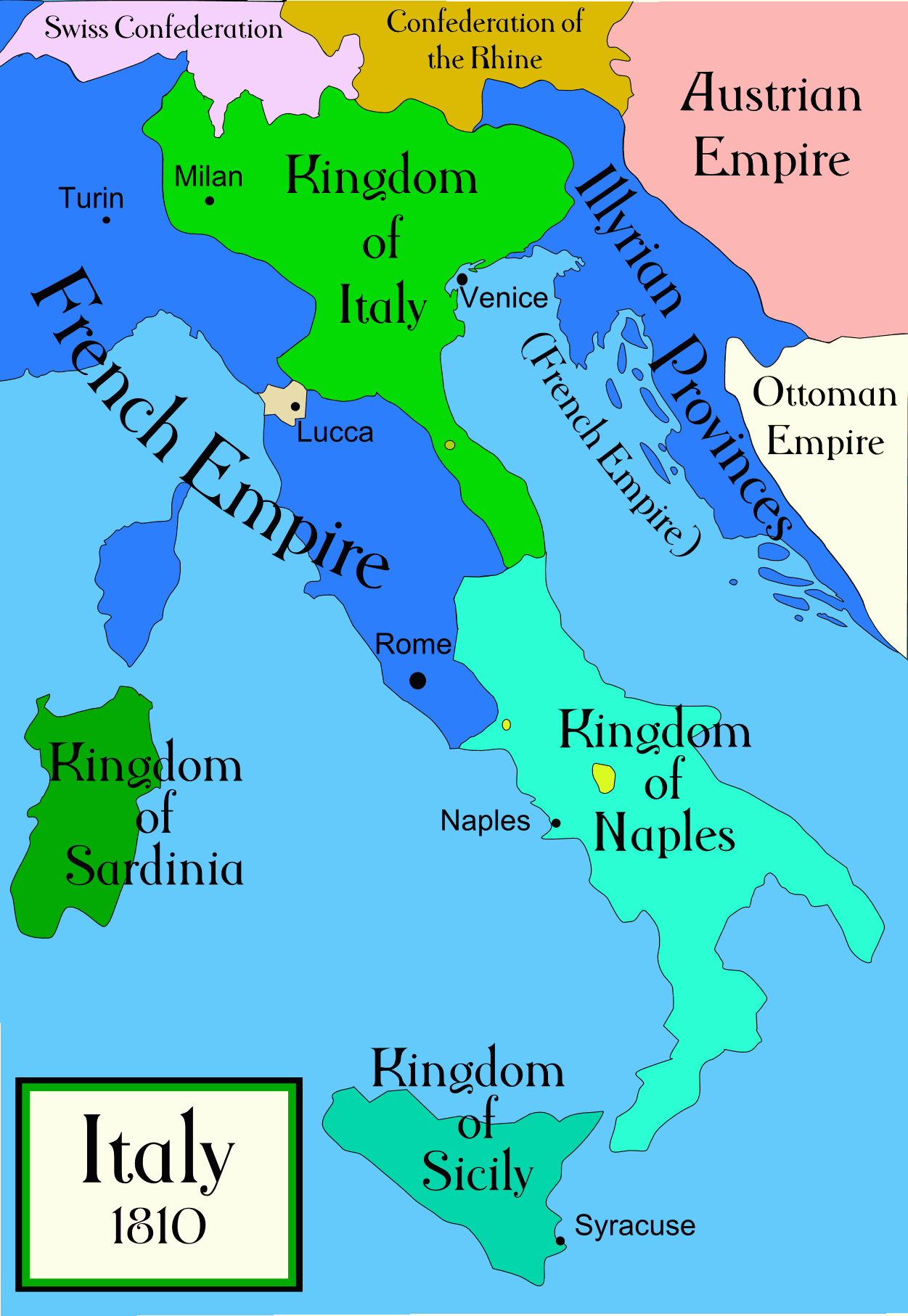
The situation in the Adriatic from 1810.

The British presence in the Adriatic was greatly strengthened in 1809 with the arrival of the frigates HMS Amphion under William Hoste and HMS Belle Poule under James Brisbane. These reinforcements made an immediate impact with a series of raids in the Dalmatian and Ionian islands. In February Belle Poule captured the Var off Valona; the French responded by despatching the frigates Danaé and Flore from Toulon. HMS Topaze attacked these frigates as they arrived, but they were able to reach Corfu before sailing north to augment French defences in the Adriatic.

Throughout the year British attacks intensified, driven by Hoste's Amphion operating from Lissa. Raids on the Italian coastline seized dozens of coastal merchant vessels and gunboats while parties of marines and sailors landed at coastal towns, driving off the defenders and blowing up the fortifications before returning to their ships. These successes in the face of negligible French opposition encouraged the British commander in the Mediterranean, Admiral Cuthbert Collingwood, to detail a force specifically to eliminate the French garrisons on the Ionian Islands. This expedition, led at sea by Brigadier-General John Oswald from HMS Warrior succeeded in landing on the island of Cefalonia on 1 October and forcing the Neapolitan garrison to surrender within hours. Within days the neighbouring islands of Zante and Ithaca had also surrendered and the detached frigate HMS Spartan under Jahleel Brenton effected a successful invasion of Cerigo shortly afterwards.

These islands were defended by small garrisons, with a few dozen regular French soldiers and larger numbers of men of the Albanian Regiment(400 on Zante, 145 on Cefalonia, 46 on Ithaca, and 27 on Cerigo) on each island. These forces were completely inadequate to offer anything but a token resistance; the captured men were transferred to Italy as prisoners of war, but more than a few of the Albanian Regiment's men simply scattered into the countryside and resumed their traditional guerrilla habits. Most of these escapees, as well as those taken prisoner, were soon induced to enter British service in what eventually became the 1st Regiment Greek Light Infantry. Over 70% of the Albanian Regiment's men on the four islands switched to the British, including most of the officers. The 1st Regiment Greek Light Infantry, initially under Richard Church and later under Robert Oswald (brother of John), soon attracted many Greek military leaders who would later play a crucial role in the Greek War of Independence, most notably Theodoros Kolokotronis.

Troop withdrawals late in 1809 delayed any further invasions until March 1810, when Collingwood's temporary successor Thomas Byam Martin detached a squadron of the Mediterranean Fleet for an operation against Santa Maura. Landings were effected on 22 March, and the island surrendered on 16 April after an eight-day siege of the principal fortress, the attackers considerably aided by the desertion of the garrison's native Greek troops to the Greek volunteers fighting on the British side. Along with a 2nd Regiment raised in 1813, the Greek units took part in the capture of Paxoi and Parga and the Allied capture of Genoa in 1814.

=== French reinforcements ===
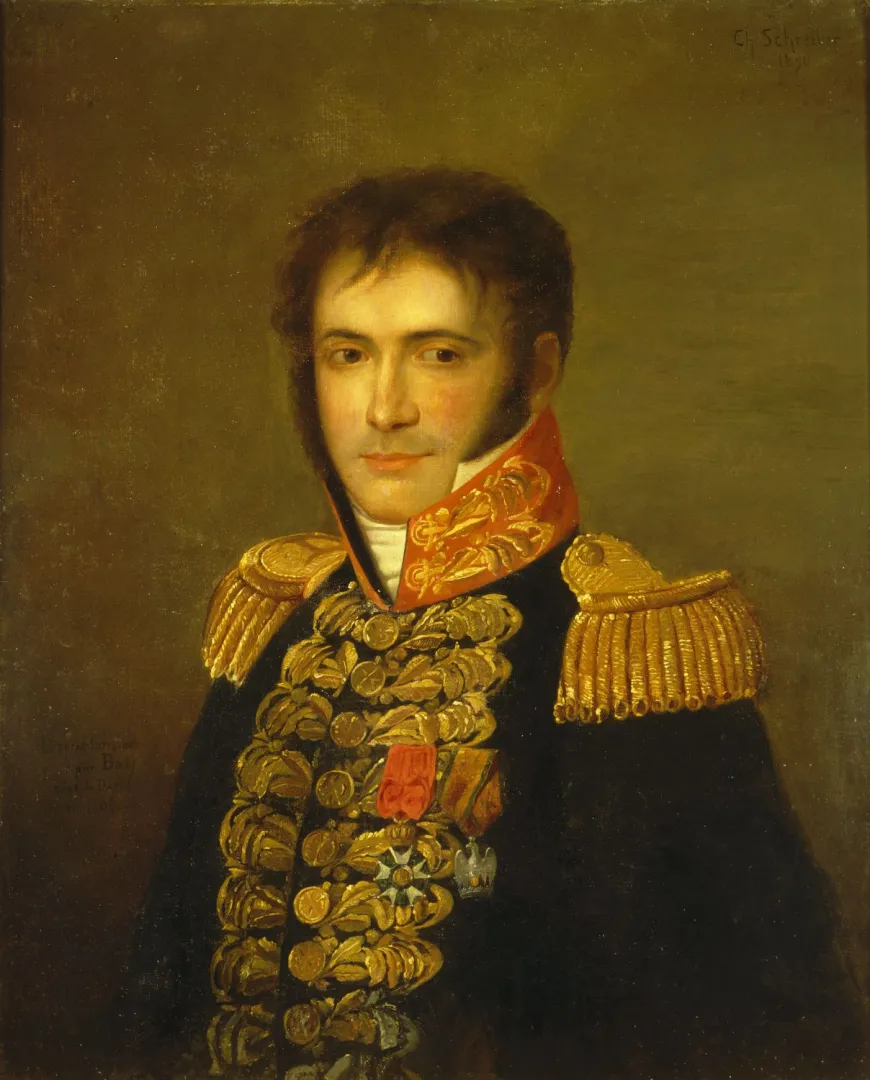
1890 portrait of Bernard Dubourdieu

The conclusion of the War of the Fifth Coalition in late 1809 had changed the political situation in the Adriatic, confirming French possession of the Illyrian Provinces and removing any threat to the Adriatic seaports from Austrian-held territory. It also freed the French Army to operate against the Ottoman Empire, as intended in the Treaty of Tilsit. It did not however affect the British frigates raiding in the Adriatic under the command of William Hoste, who was now launching coordinated raids against coastal convoys, towns and forts along the Italian coast.

In the late summer of 1810 the French Navy made their first serious effort to contest British operations in the Adriatic, with the despatch of Bernard Dubourdieu from Toulon in Favorite. Dubourdieu was considered one of the more successful frigate commanders in the French Navy, and he collected the French and Italian forces scattered across the Adriatic into a squadron that significantly outnumbered Hoste's forces. Hoste was aware of Dubourdieu's movements and maintained a careful watch on the French-led squadron in its base at Ancona.

In early October, having failed to draw Dubourdieu into battle the previous month, Hoste resupplied at Lissa and returned to the blockade of Ancona, now accompanied by HMS Cerberus. Discovering Dubourdieu and his squadron missing, Hoste gave chase in the direction of Corfu, acting on inaccurate information supplied by a passing Sicilian privateer. As Dubourdieu had planned, this detour opened Lissa to attack. Landing on the island with overwhelming force on 21 October, the French seized the shipping in the harbour but were unable to find the island's garrison, which had retreated to the mountains. Dubourdieu remained on Lissa for seven hours, but withdrew to Ancona when local fishermen informed him that Hoste was returning from the south. To defend against a repeat of this raid and to guard against intervention by the French ship of the line Rivoli, which was completing at Venice, the British Mediterranean Fleet sent the third-rate HMS Montagu to Lissa. The arrival of such a powerful vessel stifled any further French initiatives during the year, allowing Hoste to conduct limited raids on the Italian coastline.

=== Battle of Lissa ===
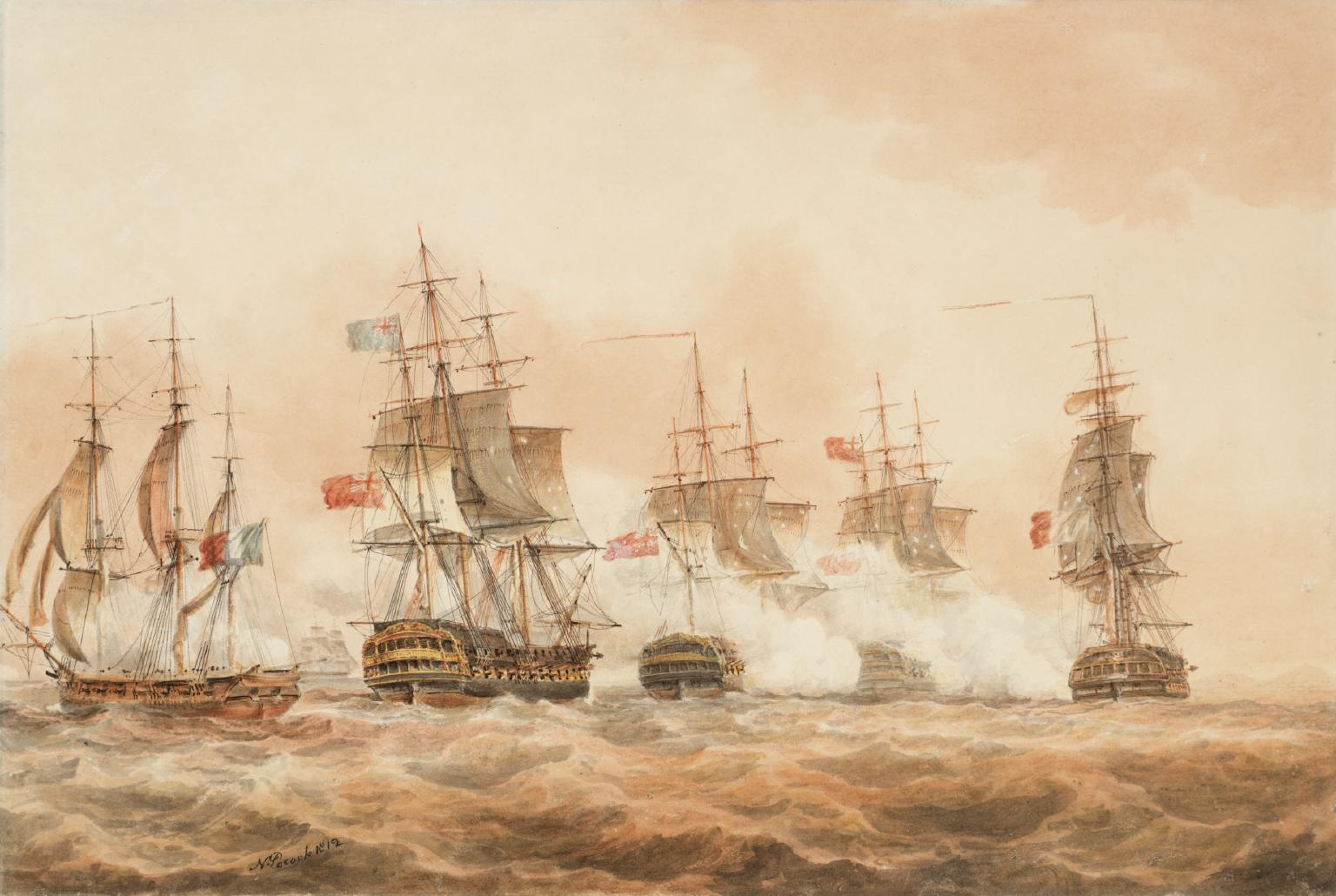
1812 painting of the Battle of Lissa

In early 1811 Montagu left the Adriatic. With HMS Cerberus and HMS Active detached on operations against the ports of Pescara and Ortona in February, Dubourdieu organised a second attack on Lissa, this time with the ambition of permanently seizing the island and garrisoning it with Italian troops. Departing Ancona on 11 March with six frigates, numerous support craft and over 500 soldiers, the Franco-Italian squadron sailed for Lissa overnight. Early in the morning on 12 March, the French were spotted by British observers on Lissa and Hoste brought his squadron, including the recently returned Cerberus and Active, to meet Dubourdieu off the island's northern coast.

Maintaining a close line of battle, Hoste forced Dubourdieu to attack him directly, Dubourdieu attempting to personally board Hoste's Amphion at the head of the Italian soldiers carried aboard his flagship. Hoste responded to the attempt with fire at point blank range from a carronade containing over 750 musket balls. The first shot killed Dubourdieu and almost all of his officers, creating confusion in the French squadron that resulted in Favorite being wrecked on Lissa's coastline. Hoste then engaged the following Flore and Bellone, forcing them both to surrender. The head of the British line, led by HMS Volage engaged the three remaining French and Italian ships, driving off Danaé and Carolina and capturing Corona. Flore too later escaped to the safety of French batteries off Lesina.

The victory at the Battle of Lissa confirmed British dominance in the region for the next three years, the French unable to replace the losses in ships and experienced officers inflicted at the action. Attempts to reinforce the Adriatic and maintain the convoys that supplied Corfu were launched from Toulon during the spring of 1811, but few reached the Adriatic; stopped by the British blockade of the Southern French ports. Of those that escaped the blockade of Toulon, most were subsequently captured by the squadron at Lissa, which had been augmented by the return of HMS Belle Poule and the newly arrived HMS Alceste, replacing HMS Amphion and the wounded Hoste who had returned to Britain. The squadron also continued the raids on coastal shipping and towns that defined the British campaign, attacking Parenzo and Ragosniza to destroy supply ships sheltering in the harbours.

In November HMS Eagle chased and captured the small French frigate Corcyre in a failed attempt by a French convoy to transport supplies to Corfu. A day later, the action of 29 November 1811 foiled the most significant French attempt to bring more forces to the Adriatic in 1811 when a British squadron under Captain Murray Maxwell in Alceste chased and engaged two frigates and an armed store ship. One frigate and the store ship were captured, the other reaching Ancona in a disabled state. This action had wide-ranging effects; Napoleon himself took an interest in the reports, and it has been suggested that it was this engagement that convinced him to change the direction of his plans for eastwards expansion from the Balkans to Russia.

=== British dominance ===
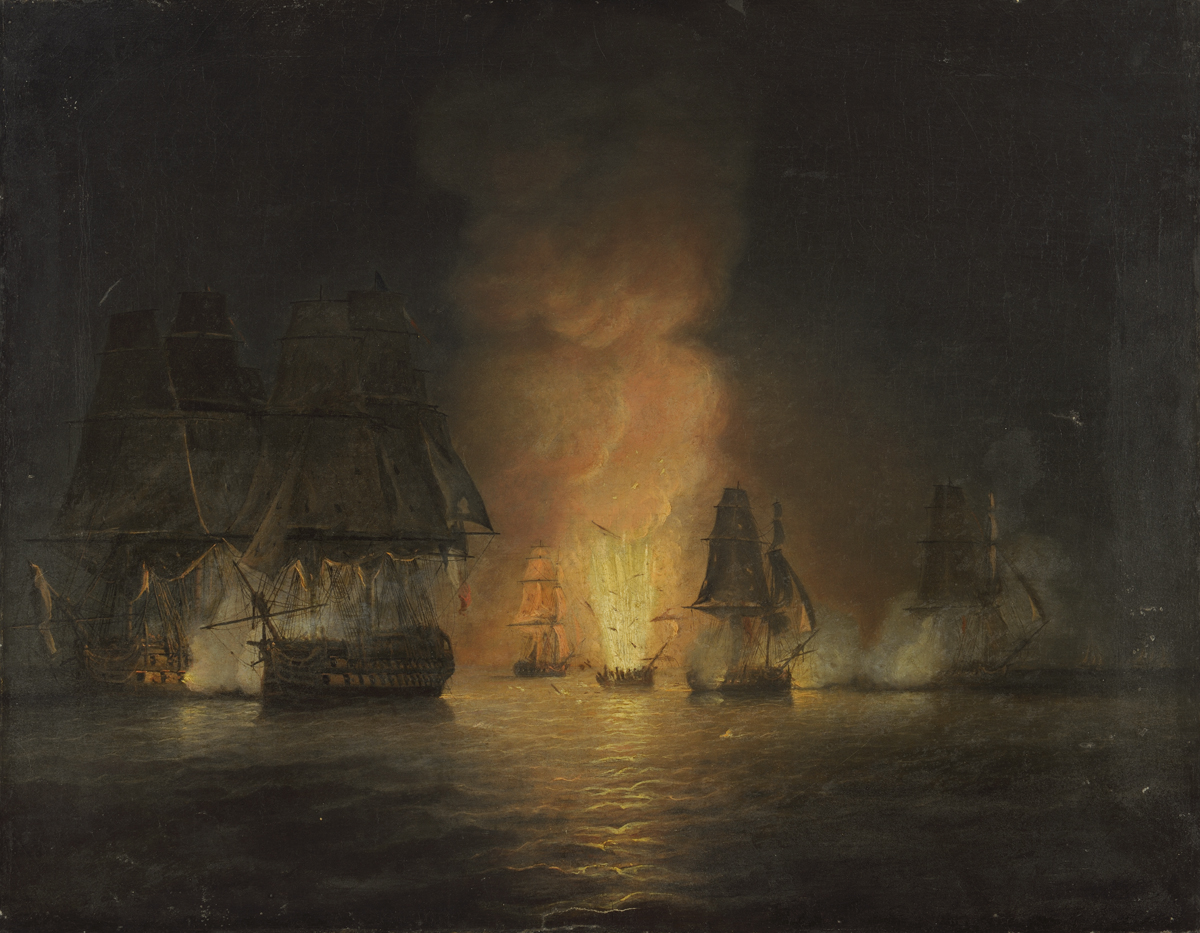
Painting of the Battle of Pirano

French hopes of regaining supremacy in the Adriatic now rested on the Rivoli, a ship of the line under construction at Venice. Although her completion had been delayed by almost two years, British intelligence was aware of her condition and had periodically supplied ships of the line to observe her movements and engage her if the opportunity should arise. In February 1812, Rivoli departed Venice for the first time, destined for Pola on her maiden voyage. Waiting for Rivoli was the British HMS Victorious, commanded by John Talbot, who chased Rivoli and captured her in a four-hour battle in which both sides suffered heavy casualties.

The loss of Rivoli ended French efforts to contest British dominance of the Adriatic. Although the campaign in the theatre would continue until 1814, from February 1812 British raiders were able to attack French convoys, forts, islands and even significant cities with impunity. In the summer of 1812, William Hoste returned to the Adriatic as captain of HMS Bacchante and raided the Apulian coast for several months. The freedom with which British cruisers could operate within the Adriatic attracted reinforcements from the Mediterranean Fleet, such as HMS Eagle which arrived off Ancona in September and blockaded the city, chasing and destroying whole coastal convoys unopposed.

Even without British intervention, French losses in the Adriatic mounted. In November 1811 the Flore, veteran of Lissa, was wrecked off Chioggia while in September 1812, the Danaé suddenly exploded with heavy loss of life at Trieste. For the French Navy, these losses were irreplaceable; French frigates were increasingly unable to escape the blockades of their home ports to reach the Adriatic and ensure the protection of their convoys. In early 1813 the first significant British squadron was detached to the Adriatic, under the command of Admiral Thomas Fremantle. This force had wide-ranging orders to seize or destroy all French islands, forts and outposts, disrupt coastal trade wherever possible and assist the allied armies of the Sixth Coalition. Under Fremantle's orders the islands or coastal towns of Lagosta, Curzola, Carlopago, Cherso, Dignano, Giuppana and others were systematically invaded, to be either held by British forces or have their shore facilities slighted to prevent their use by the French.

Fremantle also despatched several officers, including Hoste, to operate independently. Hoste in Bacchante returned to Apulia and attacked a string of ports, castles and anchorages, while Captain George Cadogan in HMS Havannah effectively halted the movement of supplies along the northern Italian coast in support of the approaching Austrian armies. In June, Fremantle himself led his whole squadron against the important port city of Fiume, seizing or burning 90 vessels from the harbour and huge quantities of naval stores after a sharp battle in the city streets. Three months later, Fremantle attacked the city of Trieste, blockading it from the sea, bombarding its defences and landing marines and cannon to join with the besieging Austrian armies and force the city's surrender.

=== End in the Adriatic ===
In the autumn of 1813, British raiders enjoyed unopposed domination over the Adriatic sea. Working in conjunction with the Austrian armies now invading the Illyrian Provinces and Northern Italy, Fremantle's ships were able to rapidly transport British and Austrian troops from one point to another, forcing the surrender of the strategic port of Zara in December. Cattaro was captured in collaboration with Montenegrin ground troops, and the same result occurred at Ragusa in January 1814. By 16 February 1814, Fremantle wrote to his superior Sir Edward Pellew that every French harbour had been captured by British or Austrian troops. Over 700 French merchant ships had been seized and the only remaining French outpost in the region was Corfu. The last surviving French warship in the region, the frigate Uranie, was destroyed by its own crew at Brindisi on 3 February to prevent her falling into British hands.

The abdication of Napoleon in early April 1814 brought the War of the Sixth Coalition to a close. Corfu, the longest-held French territory in the Adriatic surrendered and was added to the United States of the Ionian Islands under British protection.

== Aftermath ==
Many awards were presented in Britain for service in the Adriatic, Hoste, Maxwell and Fremantle among those knighted in the 1815 reforms to the knightly orders, as well as the recipients of a large amount of prize money for their captures in the theatre. The dearth of significant fleet actions in the last nine years of the war also increased public interest in actions such as that at Lissa, which were widely celebrated both before and after the peace.

=== Impact ===
Although a minor theatre of the Napoleonic Wars, the naval campaign in the Adriatic may have had far reaching consequences for the wider conflict. In particular, the events of 1811 were studied closely by Napoleon; in a chance meeting with Murray Maxwell in 1817, the former Emperor recalled Maxwell's action on 29 November 1811 intimately and commended Maxwell on his victory. The agreement between France and Russia to support each other in operations against the Ottoman Empire could not have been fulfilled without secure supply lines from France to the Balkans and those supply lines could not be assured without naval control of the Adriatic. British historian James Henderson has linked the action of November 1811 to this strategic problem, suggesting that the loss of the convoy and its 200 cannon may have been a factor in Napoleon's decision to change the emphasis of his planned campaign of 1812 from the Balkans to Russia.

On a smaller scale, the Adriatic was one of the few areas in which French and British ships saw regular combat during the period, Rivoli being the last French ship of the line captured in battle at sea. The drain of resources from the French Mediterranean Fleet to the Adriatic in the final years of the Napoleonic Wars, prompted by the need to convoy supplies to the isolated garrison of Corfu, frustrated successive French admirals, particularly after the death of Dubourdieu in 1811. The British blockade of Toulon stifled efforts to rebuild forces lost in battle and through accident to such a degree, that by 1812 British ships were free to operate almost with impunity, keeping thousands of French and Italian soldiers that would otherwise have been deployed against the Sixth Coalition in garrisons along the coastline. In the final months of the war, the ability of the Royal Navy to strike at any point on the coast without opposition undermined the entire defensive structure of the French forces in the region and eased the capture of several heavily defended port cities by the advancing Austrian armies.
