= Action of 29 November 1811 =

Minor naval engagement during the French Revolutionary Wars

- Part of the Adriatic campaign of 1807–1814
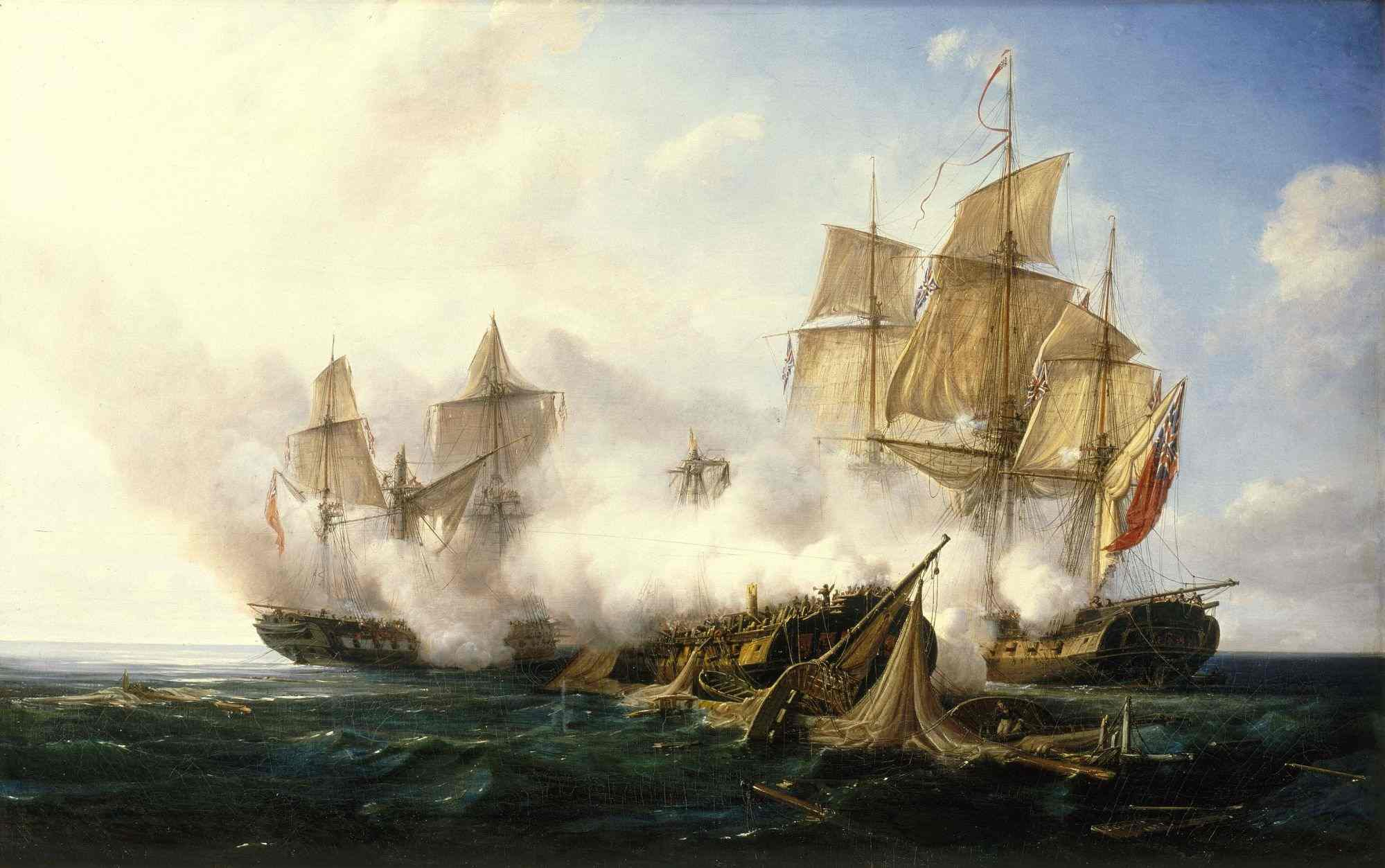
- 1837 painting of the battle
| Date | 29 November 1811 |
| Location | Off Lissa, Adriatic Sea 42.978°N 16.085°E |
| Result | British victory |

Belligerents
| United Kingdom | France |

Commanders and leaders
| Murray Maxwell | François Montford |

Strength
| 3 frigates 1 ship sloop | 2 frigates 1 storeship |

Casualties and losses
| 18 killed 43 wounded | 100 killed or wounded 300 captured 1 frigate captured 1 storeship captured |
- Location of the battle shown on a map of modern-day Croatia

The action of 29 November 1811 was a minor naval engagement fought between two frigate squadrons in the Adriatic Sea during the Adriatic campaign of the Napoleonic Wars. The action was one of a series of operations conducted by the Royal Navy and the French Imperial Navy to contest dominance over the Adriatic between 1807 and 1814. During this period the Adriatic was surrounded by French territory or French client states and as a result British interference was highly disruptive to the movement of French troops and supplies.

The action came over eight months after the British had achieved a decisive victory over the French at the Battle of Lissa and was the first squadron action since that engagement. The action of November 1811 was the result of the British interception of a French military convoy traveling from Corfu to Trieste with a consignment of cannon, and resulted in a British victory, only one French ship escaping capture by the British force. It has been suggested that this action was a factor in Napoleon's decision to change the direction of his planned eastwards expansion in 1812 from the Balkans to Russia.

== Background ==
Since the War of the Third Coalition, the French had maintained client kingdoms in Italy and Naples that controlled the western shores of the Adriatic. Over the next four years, strategically important islands and territories had been seized in the treaties of Tilsit and Schönbrunn, giving Napoleon direct command of the eastern shore. With these treaties, France had seized not only several important fortress islands, most notably Corfu, but also many important shipyards and harbours. Maintaining control of the Adriatic was however even harder than seizing it had been, the threat of attack by Austrian, Russian or Ottoman armies and the mountainous terrain of the Balkans forcing the development of garrisons that could be effectively resupplied only by sea.

The Royal Navy, preeminent in the Mediterranean since the Battle of Trafalgar in 1805, sought to disrupt French convoys across the Adriatic. Following the Russian withdrawal in 1807, the British navy dispatched a small frigate squadron to operate in the sea. The squadron was commanded by Captain William Hoste, who seized the Illyrian island of Lissa (present-day Vis) to use as a base, waging a campaign against the French and their allies that forced the French Imperial Navy to deploy significantly larger forces to combat him. This escalating series of raid and counter raid continued until March 1811, when the French commander in the Adriatic, Bernard Dubourdieu attacked Lissa with force twice that available to Hoste. In the ensuing battle Hoste not only routed his opponents, but captured two ships, sank another and killed Dubourdieu.

In the aftermath of the Battle of Lissa, the badly wounded Hoste returned to Britain in HMS Amphion leaving Captain James Brisbane in command in the Adriatic. Conflict in the theatre was widely dispersed, and so Brisbane delegated command to various commanders of small squadrons and independent cruisers. These dispersed forces continued to have success against French convoys; on 27 November 1811, the independently sailing HMS Eagle foiled an attempt to send supplies to Corfu and captured the unarmed frigate Corceyre. The following day at 07:00, a message was received at Port St. George on Lissa warning that another French convoy had been sighted close to the island.

== Chase ==
The British commander on Lissa in November 1811 was Captain Murray Maxwell of HMS Alceste with two other frigates and a ship sloop. Maxwell responded to the signal by readying his squadron to seek out and destroy the convoy, but the attempted invasion of Lissa the previous March had bred caution in the British defenders and Maxwell was therefore compelled to disembark 30 sailors and most of his marines at Port St. George and leave behind the 20-gun HMS Acorn to protect the harbour. This not only weakened the squadron but also delayed it, Maxwell's force not departing Port St. George until 19:00. It was assumed among the British squadron that the convoy comprised Danaé, Flore and Corona, the survivors of the Battle of Lissa now sailing from Trieste to Corfu to supply the island.

Shortly after passing the southern headland of Lissa, the British squadron encountered a neutral merchant ship that had been carrying Lieutenant John McDougal, formerly of HMS Unite, to Malta. McDougal had seen the French ships in passing and identified them as a convoy heading north from Corfu rather than south to it, and had ordered the merchant ship to return him to Lissa to bring warning. The French convoy was under the command of Commodore François-Gilles Montfort and consisted of three ships, the two large frigates Pomone and Pauline and the smaller Persanne. The convoy had departed Corfu on 16 November carrying a cargo of cannon to Trieste.

== Battle ==
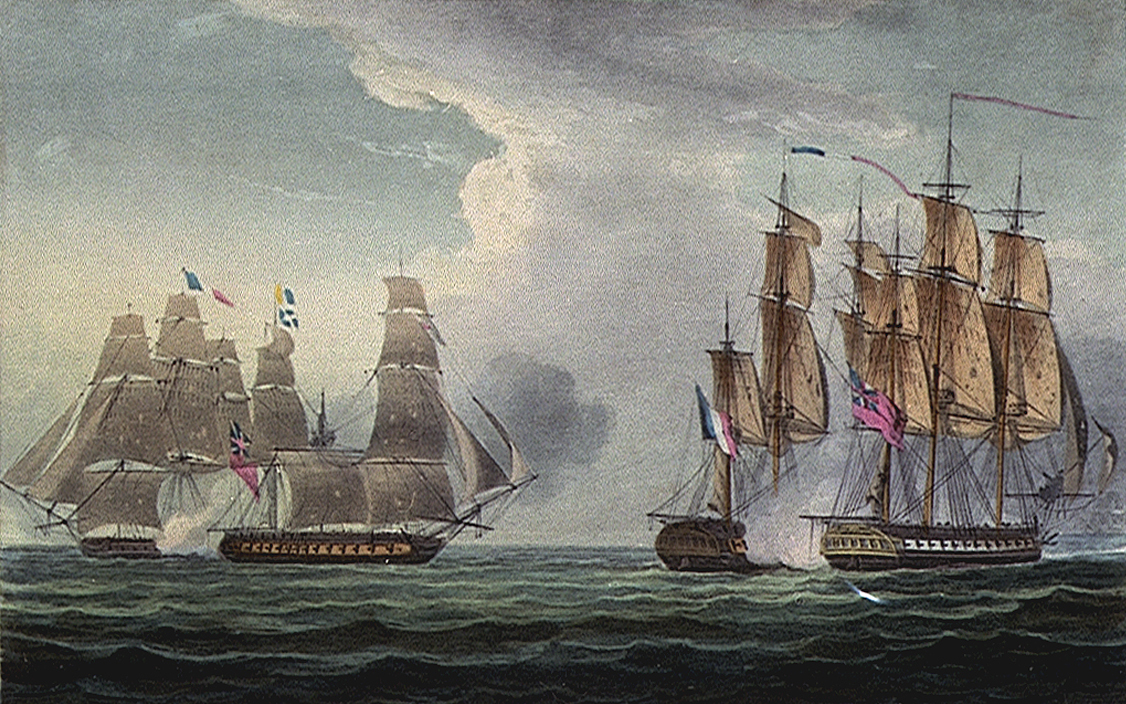
Capture of the Pomone Novr 29th 1811, Thomas Whitcombe

Casting south close to the island of Augusta (Lastovo), Captain Gordon in Active sighted the French force at 09:20 on 29 November, sailing to the north-west. Initially the French ships held their course, but on determining that the approaching squadron was British, Montfort spread all sail to escape pursuit. By 11:00 it was evident that Persanne could not maintain the pace of the two larger frigates and so turned north-east in hopes of escaping independently. Active initially gave chase to the smaller ship, but Maxwell recalled her and sent Unite after Persanne, keeping Active and Alceste in pursuit of the larger French ships. At 11:50 it became clear that Alceste would soon catch the heavily laden French ships, and Maxwell sent the telegraph signal to Gordon; "Remember the battle of Lissa", the action of eight months before at which Hoste had raised the signal "Remember Nelson".

The first shots were fired at 12:30 by Persanne close to the island of Pelagosa (Palagruža), but the main action did not begin for another hour, when Alceste and Pomone exchanged shots from their stern and bow guns. By 13:40, Alceste was firing her broadside into Pomone and simultaneously pressing on all sail in an effort to reach Pauline, but this ambition was thwarted when a shot from Pomone brought down Alceste's main topmast, slowing her suddenly and allowing Pauline to pull a little ahead. At 14:00, Active had arrived in action and was also firing into Pomone, forcing Montfort to bring Pauline round to protect her outgunned colleague. By 14:20 the conflicts between Active and Pomone and Alceste and Pauline had separated into different duels, Pomone particularly suffering severely but Active also taking heavy damage, a 32-pounder carronade shot severing Captain Gordon's leg at the height of the engagement.

At 15:05 another British ship appeared on the horizon, the ship sloop HMS Kingfisher, which persuaded Montfort that he could no longer protect the battered Pomone against superior numbers. Pauline set all sail to the west, away from her opponents who were either too battered or too distant to pursue. Alceste and Active now concentrated their full broadsides on Pomone, which soon lost both masts and was forced to surrender to prevent total destruction. Pauline escaped, later reaching Ancona safely but having suffered severe damage in the engagement.

=== Unite vs. Persanne ===
The secondary engagement of the battle was contested initially within sight of the other combatants, Persanne firing the first shots at the pursuing Unite at 12:30. The smaller size of these vessels made them faster and more manoeuvrable than their larger counterparts, and as a result it was not until 16:00 that Unite caught the smaller ship. During the pursuit, the ships had exchanged long-range shots from their stern and bow guns which caused six casualties aboard Unite but none on Persanne. From external appearances, Persanne seemed to be a frigate of similar size to the fifth rate Unite, but in fact the French ship was only lightly armed, carrying 24 small guns to her opponent's 36. As a result, when it became clear that his ship could not outrun Unite, Captain Satie surrendered after firing a token broadside rather than be destroyed by the more powerful ship.

== Aftermath ==
Casualties suffered in the action were relatively heavy on both sides. The British ships, with their reduced crews, suffered 61 men killed or wounded while the French lost over 50 on Pomone alone. There were no casualties on Persanne, and Pauline's losses are unknown, although believed to be heavy given her battered condition. The French also lost the cargo aboard Persanne and Pomone, which amounted to 201 bronze and iron cannon, 220 iron wheels for gun carriages and numerous other military stores.

Promotions were granted to the junior officers of Alceste and Active and both crews received praise and prize money for their service in the operation. Similar rewards were not made to the crew of Unite, probably because Persanne was so much smaller and less-well armed than her opponent. The total prize money was £3,500, not as much as first anticipated because neither of the captured ships were of sufficient quality to warrant purchase into the Royal Navy. Pomone had been hastily built in 1803 as the personal warship of Jérôme Bonaparte and as a result was of weak construction while Persanne had been designed as an armed storeship rather than a full-scale warship. Ultimately Pomone was transferred to Britain, briefly renamed HMS Ambuscade and broken up for materials while Persanne was sold to the Bey of Tunis. Nearly four decades later the battle was among the actions recognised by a clasp attached to the Naval General Service Medal, awarded upon application to all British participants still living in 1847.

In France, the action had more significant consequences. The loss of two ships and over 200 cannon was a serious blow to the French army marshalling in the Balkans. Napoleon himself took an interest in the engagement and it has been suggested by British historian James Henderson that this action convinced Napoleon of his inability to control the Adriatic Sea, which was vital to launching operations in the Balkans. This action may have been a factor in his decision to abandon plans to invade the Ottoman Empire, and instead to turn his attention on Russia. In the French Navy, the flight of Pauline was deemed cowardly and Captain Montfort was court-martialled and relieved of command. In 1817, when Murray Maxwell visited St Helena on his return from the East Indies where HMS Alceste had been wrecked, Napoleon greeted him with the words "Your government must not blame you for the loss of Alceste, for you have taken one of my frigates".

The effects on the Adriatic itself were slight, the action only confirming the already overwhelming British dominance in the region. The French Navy would continue to seek reinforcements for their squadrons, concentrating on the construction of several new ships in Italian seaports that would not be ready until 1812. As a result, this was the last significant action of the year in the Adriatic.

== Order of battle ==
Captain Maxwell's squadron
| Ship | Rate | Guns | Navy | Commander | Casualties | | | Notes |
| Ship | Rate | Guns | Navy | Commander | Killed | Wounded | Total | Notes |
|---|---|---|---|---|---|---|---|---|
| HMS Alceste | Fifth rate | 38 | | Captain Murray Maxwell | 7 | 13 | 20 | |
| HMS Active | Fifth rate | 38 | | Captain James Alexander Gordon | 9 | 26 | 35 | |
| HMS Unite | Fifth rate | 36 | | Captain Edwin Henry Chamberlayne | 2 | 4 | 6 | |
| HMS Kingfisher | Ship sloop | 18 | | Captain Ewell Tritton | 0 | 0 | 0 | Independent sailor, not engaged in the action. |
Casualties: 18 killed, 43 wounded, 61 total

Commodore Montfort's squadron
| Ship | Type | Guns | Navy | Commander | Casualties | | | Notes |
| Ship | Type | Guns | Navy | Commander | Killed | Wounded | Total | Notes |
Windward Division
| Pauline | Frigate | 40 | France official | Commodore François-Gilles Montfort | - | - | unknown | |
| Pomone | Frigate | 40 | France official | Captain Claude Charles Marie du Campe de Rosamel | - | - | ~50 | Captured and taken to Britain, later broken up. |
| Persanne | Storeship | 24 | France official | Captain Joseph-André Satie | 3 | 4 | 7 | Captured and sold to the Bey of Tunis. |
Casualties: At least 50 killed and wounded
Sources: Gardiner, p. 178; James, p. 378

Key

- A † symbol indicates that the officer was killed during the action or subsequently died of wounds received.
- The ships are ordered in the sequence in which they formed up for battle.

== See also ==
- Adriatic Campaign
- Murray Maxwell
