= HMS Ambuscade =

Nine Royal Navy ships have borne the name HMS Ambuscade:

- HMS Ambuscade (1746) was a 40-gun fifth rate, formerly the French ship Embuscade, captured in 1746. She fought off Cape Finisterre, captured the privateer Vainqueen and fought with Boscawen against de la Clue off Lagos. She was sold at Deptford in 1762.
- HMS Ambuscade (1773) was a 32-gun fifth rate frigate launched in 1773, captured by the French corvette Bayonnaise in the action of 14 December 1798 and renamed Embuscade. She was recaptured by the British in 1803 and broken up in 1810.
- HMS Ambuscade was the 40-gun French frigate Embuscade, which the Royal Navy captured in 1798. She was renamed HMS Seine when the previous Ambuscade was recaptured in 1803. She was broken up in 1813.
- HMS Ambuscade was the 32-gun Dutch frigate Embuscade, which the Royal Navy captured 30 August 1799 by Mitchell's squadron in the Vlieter. Foundered 9 July 1801 at Sheerness, but salved. Initially added as Ambuscade, but renamed Helder on 25 March 1803 before entering service with the RN.
- HMS Ambuscade was a 38-gun French frigate Pomone, which the Royal Navy captured in 1811. She was broken up in 1812.
- HMS Ambuscade was originally laid down in 1830 as a fifth rate, but was renamed HMS Amphion before finally being launched in 1846 as the first Royal Navy steam-powered frigate.
- HMS Ambuscade (1913), launched in 1913, was an Acasta-class destroyer that served in World War I and was scrapped in 1921.
- HMS Ambuscade (D38), launched in 1926, was a prototype destroyer which served in World War II and was sold for scrap in 1946.
- HMS Ambuscade (F172) was a Type 21 frigate launched in 1973 that fought in the Falklands War. In 1993 she was sold to Pakistan and renamed Tariq, and continued in service until 2023. It is currently undergoing decommissioning works in preparation to be returned to the United Kingdom as a museum ship.

== Battle honours ==
Ships named Ambuscade have earned the following battle honours:

- Finisterre, 1747
- Lagos, 1759
- Jutland, 1916
- Atlantic, 1940−44
- Arctic, 1942
- Falkland Islands, 1982
