= Chaucheprat Point =

Headland of Jonassen Island in Antarctic Sound

Chaucheprat Point (63°32′S 56°42′W) is a low headland at the northwest corner of Jonassen Island in Antarctic Sound. The name "Cap Chaucheprat", after M. Chaucheprat, Private Secretary to Vice Admiral Claude de Rosamel, was applied to a feature in this vicinity by Captain Jules Dumont d'Urville in 1838. The present name revives the d'Urville naming, which probably was related to the heights of Jonassen Island.
