= HMS Active (1799) =

Royal Navy frigate (1799–860)

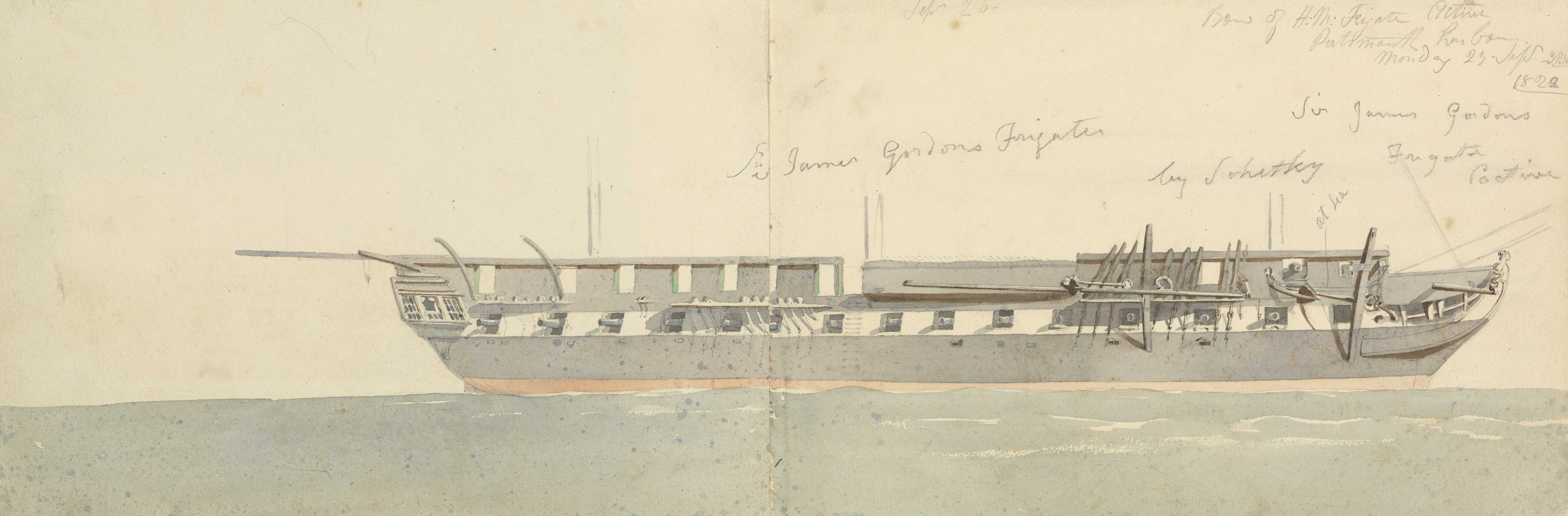
- 1822 study of Active at Portsmouth Harbour by John Christian Schetky

History

Great Britain
- Name: HMS Active
- Ordered: 27 April 1796
- Builder: Chatham Dockyard (M/Shipwright Edward Sison)
- Laid down: July 1798
- Launched: 14 December 1799
- Commissioned: December 1799
- Renamed: HMS Argo on 15 November 1833
- Reclassified: On harbour service from February 1826
- Honours and awards: Naval General Service Medal with clasps; "Egypt"; "28 June Boat Service 1810"; "Lissa"; "Pelagosa 29 Novr. 1811"
- Fate: Broken up in October 1860

General characteristics as built
- Class & type: 38-gun fifth-rate frigate
- Tons burthen: 105856/94 bm
- Length: 150 ft (45.7 m) (gundeck)
- Beam: 41 ft (12.5 m)
- Propulsion: Sails
- Sail plan: Full-rigged ship
- Complement: 284 (later 315)
- Armament: Upper deck: 28 × 18-pounder guns; QD: 8 × 9-pounder guns + 6 × 32-pounder carronades; Fc: 2 × 9-pounder guns + 2 × 32-pounder carronades

HMS Active was a 38-gun fifth-rate frigate of the Royal Navy launched on 14 December 1799 at Chatham Dockyard. Sir John Henslow designed her as an improvement on the Artois-class frigates. She served during the French Revolutionary Wars and the Napoleonic Wars, capturing numerous enemy vessels. Her crews participated in one campaign and three actions that would later qualify them for the Naval General Service Medal. She returned to service after the wars and finally was broken up in 1860.

== French Revolutionary Wars ==
Active was commissioned under Captain Charles Davers in December 1799 and convoyed East Indiamen in 1800. She sailed from Portsmouth on 28 June 1800, escorting a convoy of eight vessels, at least six of which, such as Herculean, were East Indiamen.

Then she began operating in the English Channel as part of the Channel Fleet. She later sailed with a convoy for the Mediterranean. In September 1800 she was under the temporary command of Captain John Giffard. On 2 October Active and Castor recaptured the brig Stout.

On 26 January 1801 Active captured the privateer Quinola after a two-hour chase. She was armed with 14 guns, 6 and 2-pounders, and carried a crew of 48 men. She had sailed from Morlaix the morning before and had not made any captures.

Giffard then removed to the third rate Magnificent on 23 February. Active served in the navy's Egyptian campaign between 8 March 1801 and 2 September, which qualified her officers and crew for the clasp "Egypt" to the Naval General Service Medal that the Admiralty issued in 1847 to all surviving claimants. (Note: A first-class share of the prize money awarded in April 1823 was worth £34 2s 4d; a fifth-class share, that of a seaman, was worth 3s 11½d. The amount was small as the total had to be shared between 79 vessels and the entire army contingent.)

From October Active came under Commander Thomas Shortland, also temporary. On 25 October she captured the Genoese pinco St Anna.

In 1802 Active sailed to Egypt with specie. On 7 March she arrived in Lisbon from Gibraltar, together with Constance. While the captains were ashore the police of the Guard threw the crews of their barges into subterranean holding cells. When the captains went to the office of the Captain of the Regiment of Lisbon, he had the two captains detained as well. Although the British consul and others remonstrated, the captains were held overnight before being released. The underlying issue may have been a violation of quarantine rules that applied to all vessels coming from the Mediterranean.

A letter from Gibraltar dated 24 June reported that Triumph and "a frigate" had sailed to Algiers to secure from the Dey the release of British seamen from three vessels that the Algerines had seized and sold the vessels and cargoes on the grounds that the vessels had sailed the Mediterranean with false passes, or old ones issued to other vessels. The frigate that accompanied Triumph was Active.

On 19 September a lightning storm occurred at Gibraltar. Ships that sustained strikes, in some cases that caused damage or casualties, included Active, Dragon, Goliath, and Superb. A strike destroyed several feet of the topgallant mast on Active and killed the ship's butcher, who had been standing near the main mast with a cleaver in his hand.

1 September 1803 she was near Gibraltar and, along with HMS Narcissus, spoke with USS New York.

== Napoleonic Wars ==
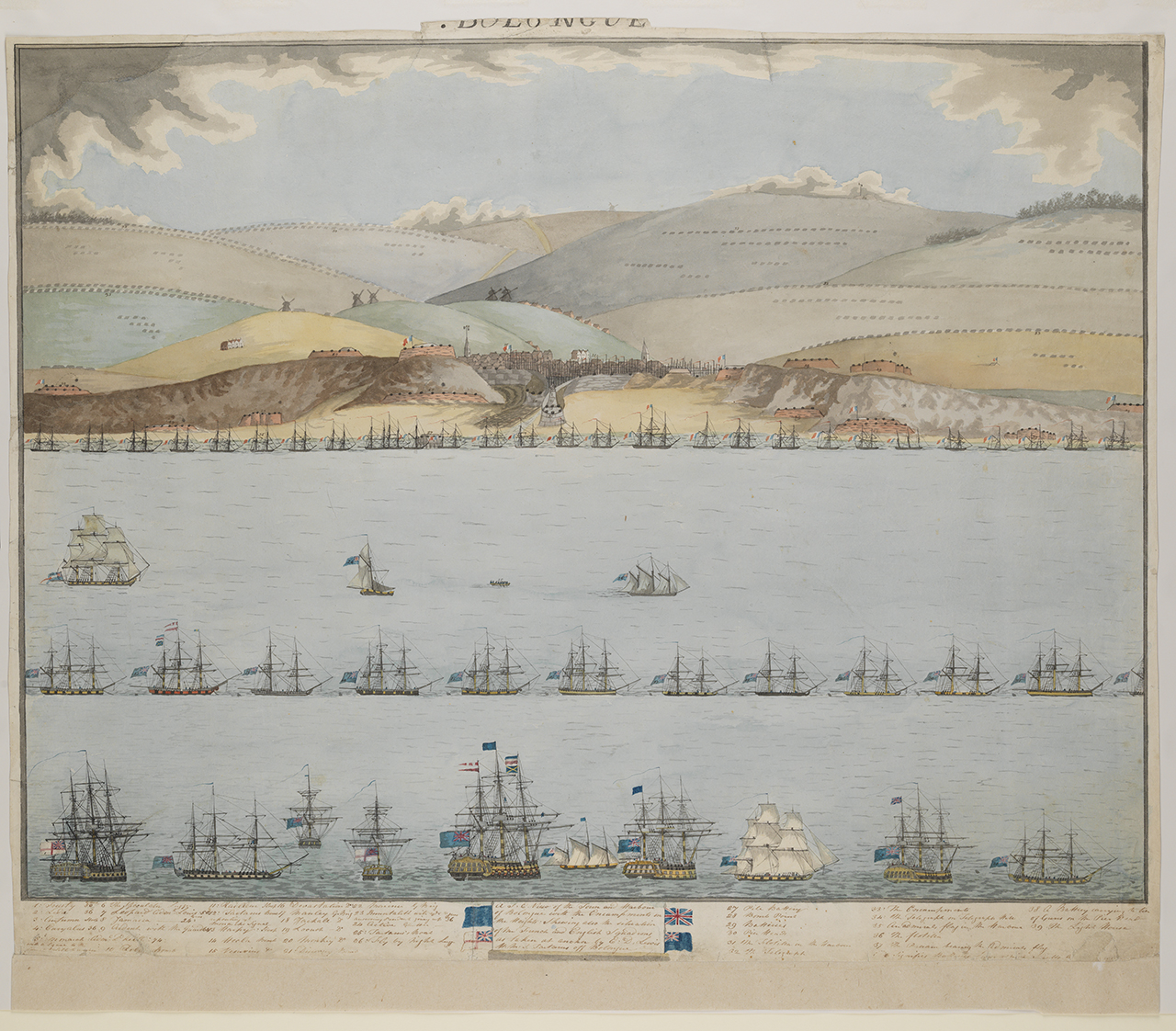
Active at the attack on Boulogne October 1804

In August 1804, Active was under the command of Captain Richard Mowbray, for the blockade of Toulon, in the Mediterranean. (Captain Davers had resigned his command due to ill-health caused by yellow fever, which he had caught on the Leeward Islands station. He died in 1805.) On 27 April Active captured the French letter of marque schooner Les Amis. Les Amis was armed with four 6-pounder guns, had a crew of 20 men, and was carrying a cargo of wine and merchandise from Bordeaux to her home port of Cayenne.

At some point Active captured the Prussian vessels Ida Margaretta, Anna Dorothea, and Norberg. On 12 March 1807, Active and Endymion captured the Danish vessel Henrie and Maria. The prize money was remitted from Malta.

In 1807, Active returned to the Mediterranean. An initial assignment was her participation in Thomas Louis's squadron in Admiral Duckworth's Dardanelles Operation. On the way in on 19 February Active drove a frigate aground and then burnt her, all without suffering any casualties. However, Active had eight men wounded on 3 March during the withdrawal from the Dardanelles, one of whom, the boatswain, later died. During the withdrawal she suffered a hit from an 800-pound stone cannonball, 6'6" in diameter, which did damage but caused no casualties.

Almost a year later, on 26 March 1808, she and the 64-gun Standard captured the Franco-Italian brig Friedland off Cape Blanco. Mowbray took possession of Friedland after a chase of several hours. The brig might have escaped had she not lost her topmast. She was one year old and was armed with 16 French 12-pounder guns. Active took her prize to Malta, together with the prisoners, who included Commodore Don Amilcar Paolucci, commander in chief of the Italian Marine, and Knight of the Iron Crown. The Royal Navy took Friedland into service as HMS Delight.

In 1809 Active returned to Britain and was paid off. She was recommissioned in June 1809 under Captain James Alexander Gordon, who sailed for the Adriatic on 4 October.

In 1810 she participated in a raid on Grao, near Trieste. Together with Cerberus and Amphion she seized a coastal convoy of trabaccolos and other vessels. Active did not report casualties. In 1847 the Admiralty issued the Naval General Service Medal with clasp "28 June Boat Service 1810" to all surviving claimants from the action.

On 14 June Cerberus, in company with Active and Swallow, captured three gunboats - the Vincentina, Modanese and Elvetica (or Elvetria).

On 4 February 1811 Active and Cerbrus sent in their boats to raid Pescara. The British destroyed one trabaccalo, after first transferring its cargo to Active, and sent another three to Lissa. All four were from Ancona. Active lost one man wounded.

Five days later the boats from Active and Cerbrus raided Ortona. Despite facing heavy fire, the British suffered only four men wounded. They captured one trabaccolo and ten Italian transports that were carrying supplies from Ancona to the French at Corfu. The British sent all the vessels they captured to Lissa, or destroyed them. The vessels were:

- Eugenie, of six guns, commanded by a lieutenant;
- Transport Fortunée, No. 52, laden with Corn, burnt after her cargo was transferred to another vessel;
- Transport, name unknown, laden with oil;
- Transport, name unknown, No. 2, laden with plank and corn;
- Transport St. Anongiato, laden with hemp and cordage;
- Transport, name unknown, No. 50, laden with wheat;
- Transport, name unknown, No. 55, partly laden with sundries;
- Transport Anime del Purgatorio, laden with rice, cargo taken on board and vessel burnt;
- Transport, name, unknown, laden with wheat.
- Two transports, names unknown, burnt in the port.

In addition, the British were able to burn two warehouses holding oil, soldiers' clothing, ammunition, and naval stores, including cables, blocks, hawsers, hemp, and the like.

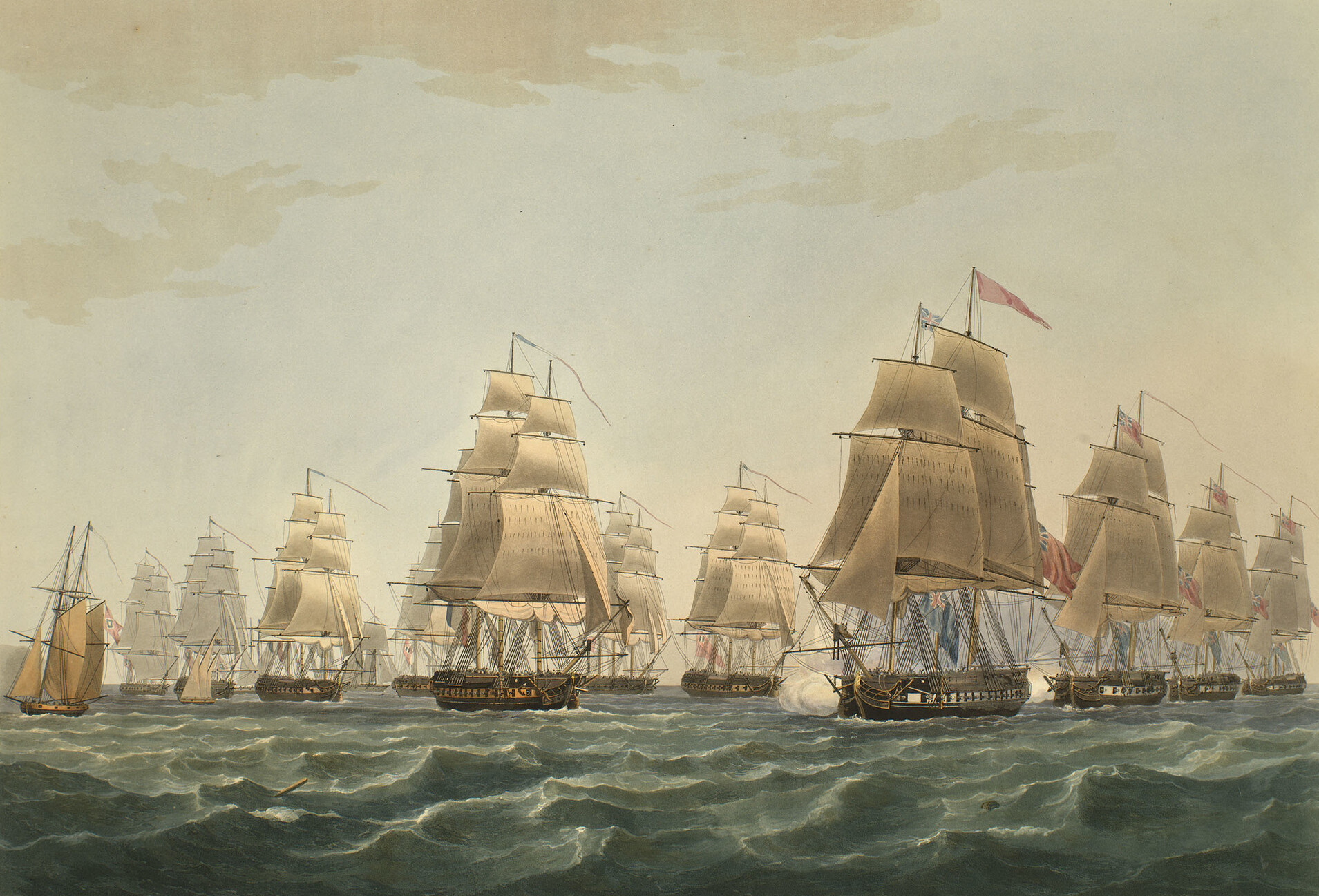
Active (second from right) at the Battle of Lissa in the Adriatic, on 13 March 1811

On 14 March Active participated in the Battle of Lissa, where she lost nine men killed and 26 wounded, but together with Cerberus captured the French frigate Corona. Active, Amphion, Cerberus, and Volage encountered a French force consisting of five frigates, one corvette, one brig, two schooners, one gun boat, and one xebec, all under M. Dubourdieu, Captain de Vaisseux. The French force had double the guns and triple the number of men relative to the British force. The British also captured the frigate Bellona and caused the frigate Favorite to run ashore where she blew up. Flora (or Flore) also surrendered but then sailed off again while Amphion, to which she had struck, was capturing Bellona. Captain William Hoste wrote a letter to the captain of Flora arguing that he was honor bound to give up his vessel to Amphion. The acting captain of Flora replied that she had not struck but rather that a shot had carried away her flag and that therefore the French were not going to surrender her. (Note: In November Flora was reported to have been lost while sailing from Trieste to Venice. A storm apparently caused her to run aground near Chiossa. All but a handful of the men aboard her drowned.) Active lost nine men killed and 26 wounded in the battle. In 1847 the Admiralty issued the Naval General Service Medal with clasp "Lissa" to all surviving claimants.

On 23 July Active, Alceste, and Acorn captured French property on Lissa.

On 27 July Active's boats attacked a convoy in the port of Rogoznica on the Dalmatian coast that was carrying grain to the garrison at Ragusa. A landing party captured a fort on a hill overlooking the port and the remaining boats then entered. There they found three gunboats and 28 transports. The British brought out the three gunboats and 18 transports after burning 10 of the transports. Active suffered only four men wounded; the French appeared to have lost a number of men killed and wounded.

Next, Active participated in the destruction of a French convoy at the action of 29 November 1811. In the engagement, the British captured the frigate Pomone and the storeship Persanne. The action cost Active eight men dead and 27 wounded, with Captain Gordon hit by a cannonball that severed his knee, leaving his leg hanging by a thread. Amputation proved necessary but Captain Gordon, complete with a wooden leg, was still able to sail Seahorse within the year. Active shared the prize money with Alceste, Unite, Kingfisher, and Acorn, which were either in sight, or sharing by agreement. (Note: The prize money for Gordon for Persanne was £477 9s 10d; for an ordinary seaman it was £5 5s 4d. For an ordinary seaman this represented about three-month's wages.) In 1847 the Admiralty issued the Naval General Service Medal with clasp "Pelagosa 29 Novr. 1811" to all surviving claimants from the action.

In 1812 Active returned to Britain.

== Post-war service ==
In 1815 Active came under Captain William King, and then in October Captain Philip Carteret. She was fitted for sea from November 1815 to April 1816 and then was on the Jamaica station in 1817. In 1819 she was fitted with man-powered paddles, an experimental design by Lieutenant Burton.

In January 1819 she was recommissioned under Captain Sir James Gordon on the Halifax station. In December 1821 she was under Captain Richard King "on particular service". In September 1824 she was on the Lisbon station under Captain Robert Rodney.

== Fate ==
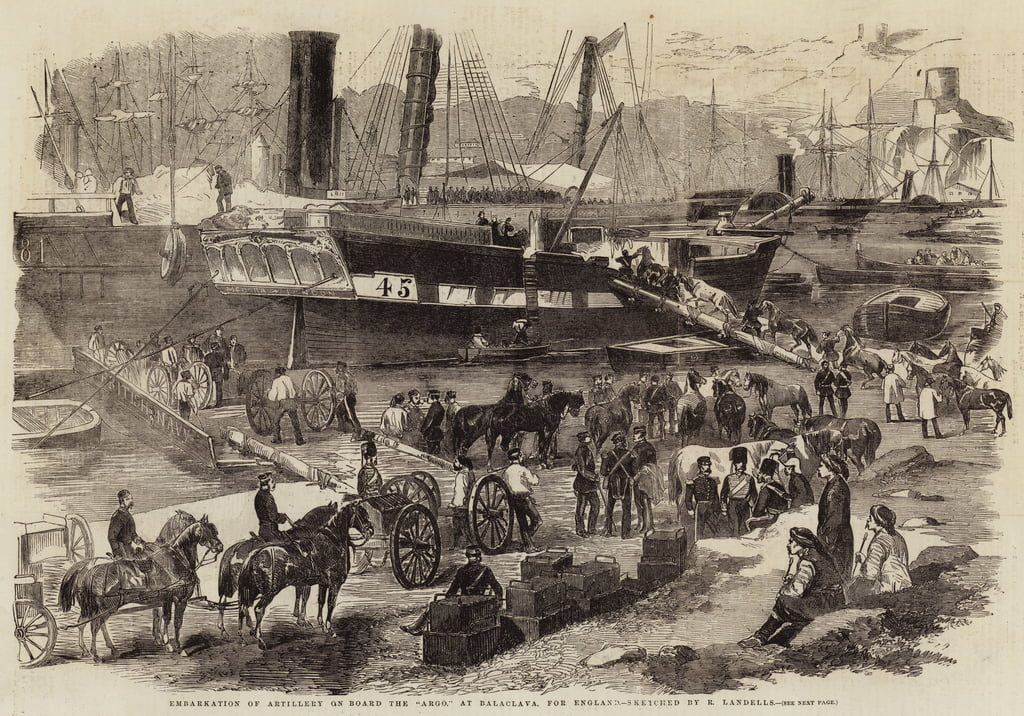
Embarkation of Artillery on board the Argo, at Balaclava, for England in 1856

Active was fitted as a receiving ship at Plymouth between October 1825 and February 1826. She was renamed Argo on 15 November 1833. Her breaking up was completed on 21 October 1860 at Plymouth.
