= Hortense-class frigate =

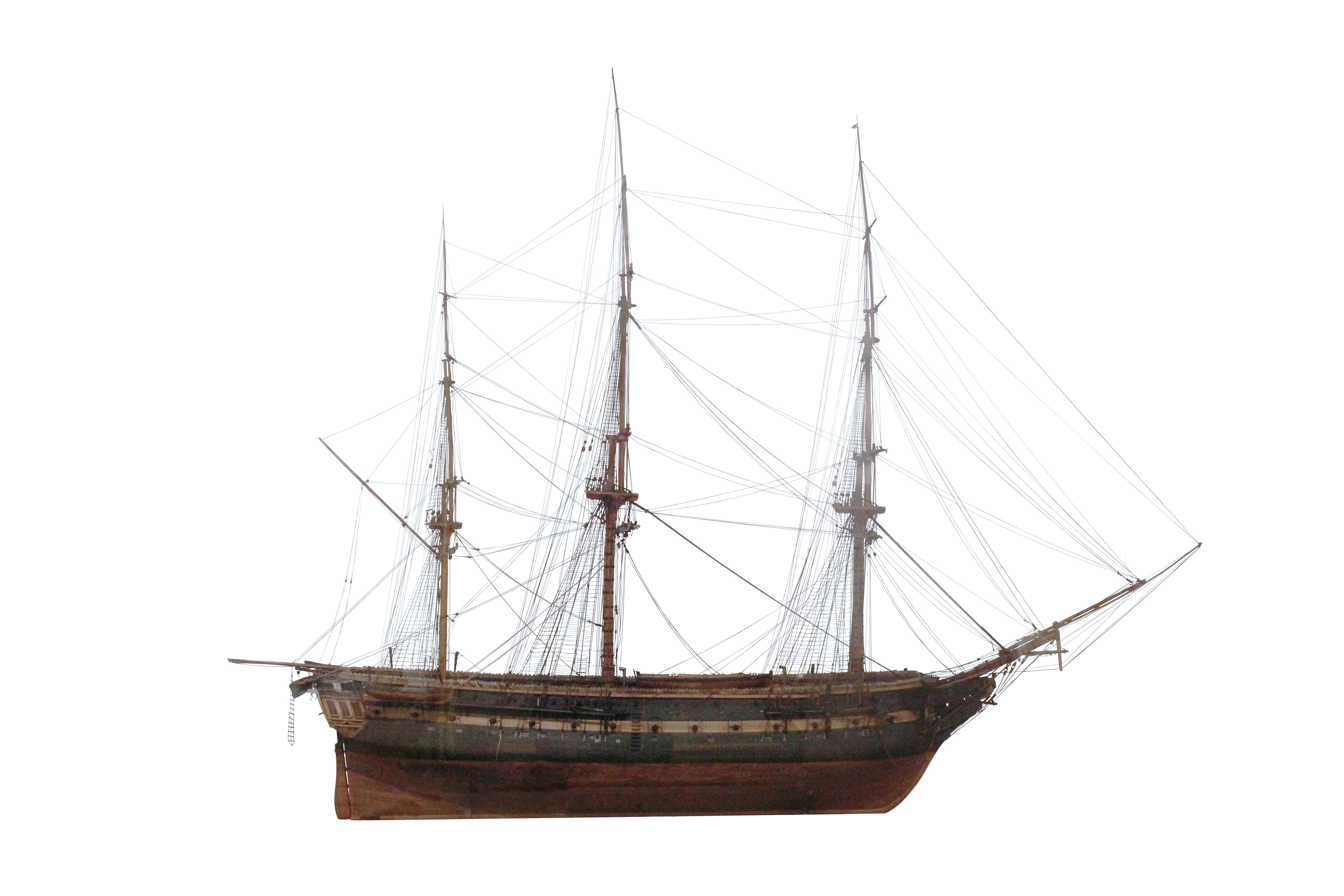
- Model of Hortense, on display at Toulon naval museum

Class overview
- Name: Hortense
- Operators: French Navy
- Preceded by: Virginie class
- Succeeded by: Pallas class
- Planned: 8
- Completed: 6
- Canceled: 2

General characteristics
- Type: Frigate
- Length: 46.77 m (153 ft 5 in)
- Beam: 11.91 m (39 ft 1 in)
- Draught: 5.9 m (19 ft 4 in)
- Propulsion: 1,950 m^{2} (21,000 sq ft) of sail
- Complement: 326
- Armament: nominally 40 guns; in practice carried either 44 or 46 guns: upper deck - 28 long 18-pounders; quarter deck & forecastle ("les gaillards") - 8 long 8-pounders and 8 36-pounder carronades (there were several variant ordnance fits on the gaillards)

Jacques-Noël Sané designed the Hortense-class 40-gun frigates of the French Navy in 1802, a development of his 1793 design for the Virginie class. Eight frigates to this new design were ordered between 1801 and 1806, but two ordered on 18 April 1803 at Antwerp (Néréïde and Vénus) were cancelled unstarted in June 1803; the other six were built between 1803 and 1807. Of the six, one was wrecked at sea and the British Royal Navy captured three, taking two into service.

- Hortense

Builder: Toulon
Ordered: 6 April 1801
Laid down: 14 December 1802
Launched: 3 July 1803
Completed: January 1804
Fate: Renamed Flore on 14 March 1814, reverted to Hortense 22 March 1815, then back to Flore 15 July 1815. Deleted 25 November 1840

- Hermione

Builder: Toulon
Ordered: 2 September 1803 as République Italienne
Laid down: October 1803, renamed Hermione on 26 December 1803
Launched: 2 December 1804
Completed: March 1805
Fate: Wrecked 18 August 1808 near Trépied (near Brest).

- Pomone

Builder: Murio & Migone, Genoa
Ordered:
Laid down: August 1803
Launched: 10 February 1805
Completed: May 1805
Fate: Captured by the British Navy on 29 November 1811, becoming HMS Ambuscade.

- Manche

Builder: Cherbourg
Ordered: 6 October 1803 as Département de la Manche
Laid down: 22 June 1804
Launched: 5 April 1806, when name shortened to Manche
Completed: September 1806
Fate: Captured by the British Navy on 4 December 1810, but not added to that navy.

- Caroline

Builder: Antwerp
Ordered: 24 April 1804
Laid down: May 1804
Launched: 15 August 1806
Completed: December 1806
Fate: Captured by the British Navy on 21 September 1809, becoming HMS Bourbonnaise.

- Pauline

Builder: Toulon
Ordered: 21 March 1806
Laid down: May 1806
Launched: 18 April 1807
Completed: July 1807
Fate: Renamed Bellone on 11 April 1814, reverted to Pauline on 22 March 1815, then again to Bellone on 15 July 1815. Deleted 11 December 1841.

== Bibliography ==
- Rif Winfield and Stephen S. Roberts, French Warships in the Age of Sail 1786-1861: Design, Construction, Careers and Fates. Seaforth Publishing, 2015. ISBN 978-1-84832-204-2.
