= Claude Charles Marie du Campe de Rosamel =

French naval officer (1774–1848)

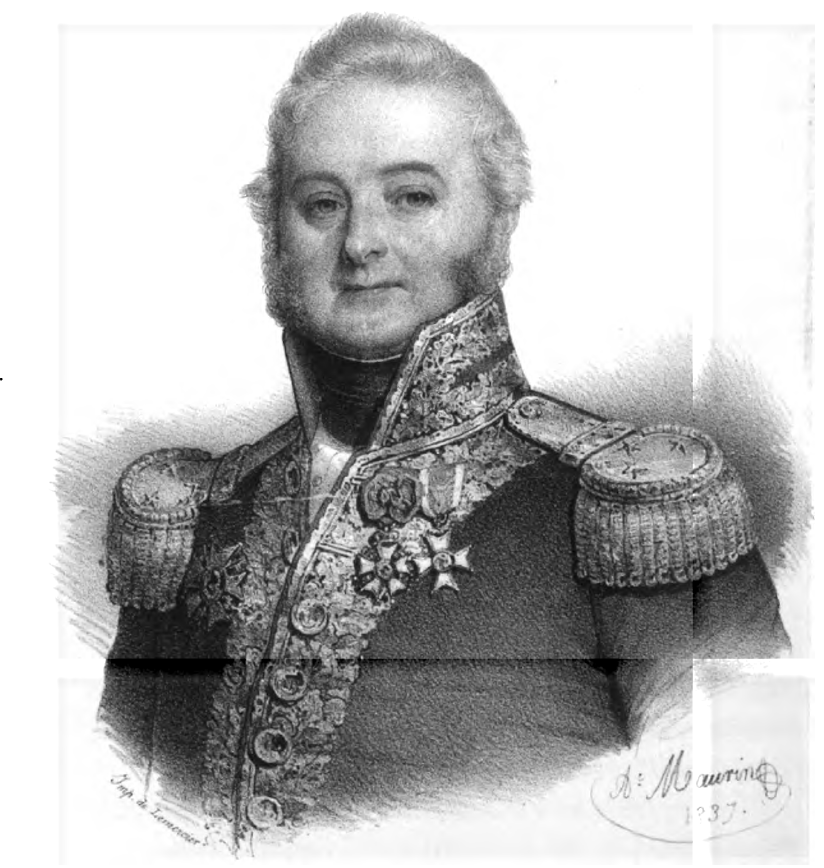
Claude Charles Marie Du Campe De Rosamel-Antoine Maurin

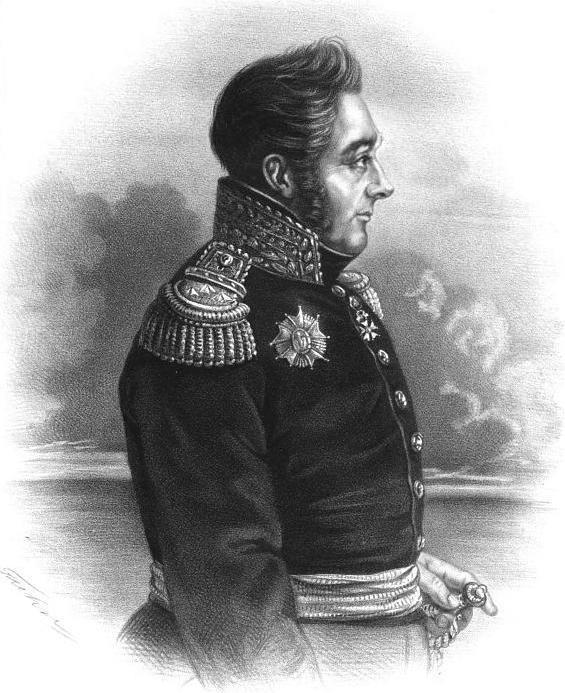
Claude Charles Marie du Campe de Rosamel

Claude Charles Marie du Campe de Rosamel (24 June 1774 – 27 March 1848) was a French politician and naval officer.

Rosales was born at the Château de Rosamel in Frencq, Northern France, on June 24, 1774.

He was commander of the Pomone in the action of 29 November 1811 against the British.

The damaged state of the Pomone at her surrender clearly proved, that her colours had not come down until all further resistance was vain. Her main and mizen masts fell, as we have stated, during the action, and her foremast very soon shared their fate. The hull of the Pomone was so shattered by the Active's quick and well-directed fire, that the ship had five feet water in the hold; and her loss, out of a crew of 332 men and boys, amounted, as acknowledged by her officers, to 50 in killed and wounded."

Rosamel was wounded in action.

He served as French naval minister from September 6, 1836 until March 31, 1839. During his administration, several national scientific voyages were launched, most notably that of the Astrolabe to the Magellan Straits and Antarctica. It was during this voyage that an island was named in his honor. It was subsequently renamed Andersson Island.

Rosamel sent French troops to Cuba to guard its assets in Cuba and Mexico in March 1837, precipitating more problems between the governments. France had failed to recognize Mexico's independence. Mexico ultimately declared war against France, in which a naval blockade played a key role.

He was said to have left the Ministry poorer than when he entered. He died in Paris on March 27, 1848, leaving his children without an inheritance.
