= Action of 4 April 1808 =

- Part of the Napoleonic Wars
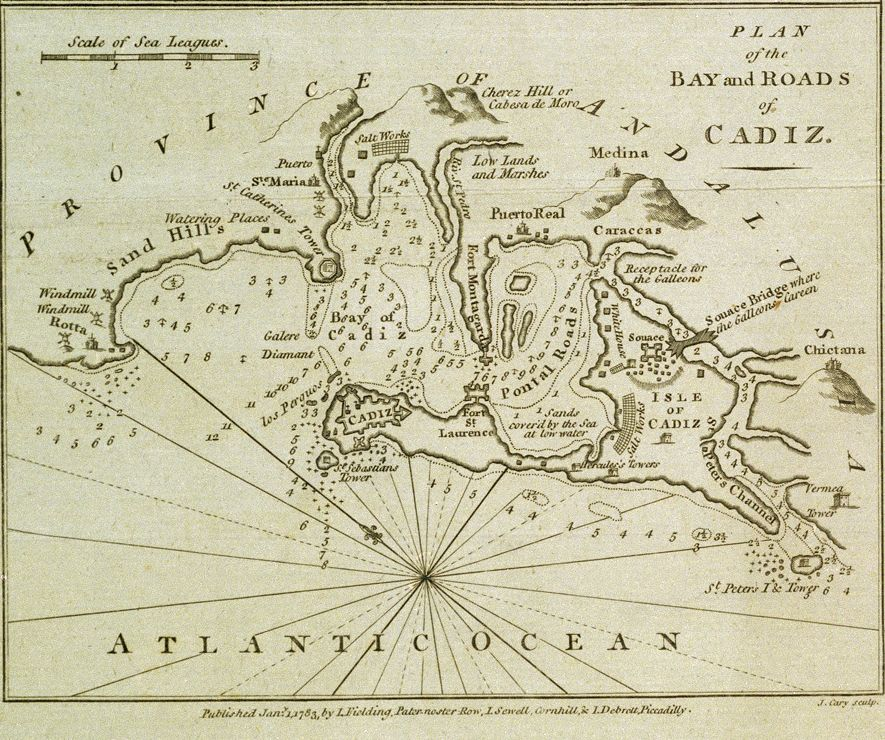
- 1783 map of the Bay of Cádiz
Date	4 April 1808
Location	Off Rota, Bay of Cádiz
Result	British victory

Belligerents
United Kingdom	Spain

Commanders and leaders
Murray Maxwell	Unknown

Strength
2 frigates 1 brig sloop	20 gunboats Shore batteries

Casualties and losses
1 killed 2 wounded	2 gunboats destroyed 7 merchant ships captured

The action of 4 April 1808 was a naval engagement off Rota, Andalusia in the Bay of Cádiz during the Napoleonic Wars. The Royal Navy warships HMS Alceste, HMS Mercury and HMS Grasshopper intercepted and defeated a large Spanish convoy protected by twenty gunboats and a train of batteries close to shore.

== Background ==
Blockade duties around Cádiz were still being carried out by the Royal Navy over two years since the Battle of Trafalgar. The intention was the same as it was in 1805, to keep the Franco-Spanish fleet "locked up" and also to keep a watchful eye on any movements by sea and attack if necessary. These included vessels such as that under the command of Captain Murray Maxwell with his 38-gun frigate HMS Alceste, the 28-gun frigate HMS Mercury under Captain James Gordon and the 18-gun brig sloop HMS Grasshopper under Captain Thomas Searle.

== Battle ==
Alceste, Mercury and Grasshopper lay at anchor about three miles to the north-west of the lighthouse of San Sebastián near Cádiz, when a large Spanish convoy under the protection of about 20 gunboats and a large train of artillery on the beach, was observed coming down close along-shore from the northward. At 3 p.m., the Spanish convoy being then abreast of the town of Rota, Andalusia, Maxwell's squadron weighed anchor with the wind at west-south-west, and stood in for the body of the Spanish vessels.

At 4 p.m. the shot and shells from the Spanish gunboats and batteries passing over them, the British ships opened their fire. Alceste and Mercury devoted their principal attention to the gun boats; while Grasshopper, drawing much less water, stationed herself upon the shoal to the southward of the town and so close to the batteries that by the grape from her carronade drove the Spaniards from their guns, and at the same time kept in check a division of gunboats which had come out from Cadiz to assist those engaged by the two frigates. The situation of Alceste and Mercury was also rather critical, they having in the state of the wind to tack every fifteen minutes close to the end of the shoal.

The first lieutenant of Alceste, Lieutenant Stewart, intended to board the convoy with boats. Accordingly, the boats of the Alceste with marines set off and the boats of Mercury quickly followed. As they came across the convoy, the two divisions of boats, led by Lieutenant Stewart, soon boarded and brought out seven merchants, from under the muzzles of the Spanish guns and from under the protection of the barges and pinnaces of the Franco-Spanish squadron of seven ships of the line; which barges and pinnaces had also by that time effected their junction with the gun-boats. By early evening the action had ended and the three frigates set off with the captured prizes.

== Aftermath ==
Exclusive of the seven merchants captured, two of the gunboats were destroyed and another seven had run on shore by the fire from the two British frigates and brig. The merchants contained ship timber, gunpowder and weapons. The cost to the British was one dead and two slightly wounded on board the Grasshopper. The damage to the latter, however, were extremely severe, as well in hull, masts, rigging and sails. With the exception of an anchor shot away from the Mercury, the damage to the other two frigates was confined to their sails and rigging.
