= Aretas William Young =

Canadian politician (1778–1835)

Sir Aretas William Young
- Born: 31 March 1777; London, England
- Died: 1 December 1835; Charlottetown, Prince Edward Island
- Military career
- Allegiance: United Kingdom
- Branch: (United Kingdom) British Army
- Service years: 1795 to 1835
- Rank: Colonel
- Conflicts: French Revolutionary Wars; Napoleonic Wars; Peninsular War
- Awards: Knight Bachelor
- Other work: Lieutenant Governor of Prince Edward Island

Colonel Sir Aretas William Young (31 March 1777 – 1 December 1835) was a British Army officer and colonial administrator of the early nineteenth century. After extensive military service in the Peninsular War and elsewhere, Young held a range of colonial government roles in the West Indies and Prince Edward Island, of which he was Lieutenant Governor. Young was knighted in 1834 for his colonial service. While in office at Charlottetown, he died, and was replaced by General John Harvey. Sir Aretas is a direct ancestor of the musician Will Young.

== Life ==
=== Early career ===
Young was born in 1777, the son of James and Rebecca Young. He was baptised at a month old at St Olave Hart Street church in the City of London. He entered the army in 1795 as an ensign, purchasing a captaincy in the 13th Regiment of Foot in 1796 and being deployed to Ireland during the Rebellion of 1798.

In 1801, Young and his regiment were attached to General Abercromby's army in the Egyptian campaign and the fighting around Alexandria and in 1807 Young transferred to the 47th Regiment of Foot as a major. Young later served in all the major campaigns of the Peninsular War until 1813, when he was promoted to lieutenant colonel and attached to the administration of the island of Trinidad, captured from the Spanish 16 years before.

=== Caribbean ===
In 1815, Young was engaged in the invasion of Guadeloupe and for his service in the operation was commended by King Louis XVIII.

Between the end of the war and 1825, Young performed a number of roles as deputy to the Governor of Trinidad, including commanding the 3rd West Indian Regiment, and acting as an official on Grenada and Trinidad. For his work as administrator in the absence of Sir Ralph Woodford, he was rewarded for the "candor, integrity and impartiality which had marked his administration". Recognition included large sums of money and ceremonial gifts, including a valuable sword, by the island's Council of Assembly.

In 1826, Young was made protector of slaves in Demerara. However, he failed to improve conditions and often mediated rather than defended. He was rebuked twice for inadequate records and suspended. He argued that his behaviour wasn't wilful and that he misunderstood the law and what was asked of him.

=== Prince Edward Island ===
In 1831 Young was nominated as Lieutenant Governor of Prince Edward Island, off the coast of Canada, following the sudden death of Sir Murray Maxwell, who had briefly held the role.

Young was very successful in his governorship, being knighted in 1834 for his services. He died at Charlottetown the following year and was replaced by Sir John Harvey.

== Personal life ==
Young married Sarah Cox of Coolcliffe, Wexford, and their children included Henry Edward Fox Young, later Governor of South Australia (1848–1855) and Tasmania (1855–1861).

== Notes ==
Government offices
Preceded by Sir Murray Maxwell	Lieutenant-Governor of Prince Edward Island; 1831–1835	Succeeded by George Wright (acting); Sir John Harvey
