= French frigate Pauline =

French Navy Hortense-class frigate

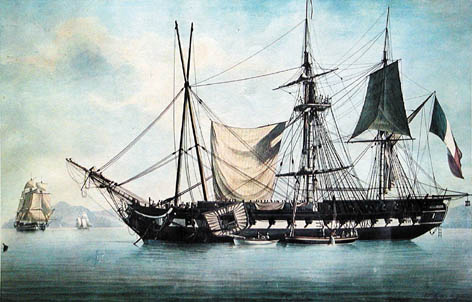
- Pomone, sister-ship of Pauline

History

France
- Name: Pauline
- Namesake: Pauline Bonaparte
- Ordered: 21 March 1806
- Builder: Toulon, plans by Sané
- Laid down: May 1806
- Launched: 18 April 1807
- Commissioned: 15 May 1807
- Decommissioned: 1840
- Renamed: Bellone, 11 April 1814
- Fate: Struck 11 December 1841

General characteristics
- Class & type: Hortense-class frigate
- Length: 48.75 m (159 ft 11 in)
- Beam: 12.2 m (40 ft 0 in)
- Draught: 5.9 m (19 ft 4 in)
- Propulsion: Sails
- Sail plan: Ship
- Armament: 40 guns; 26 × 18-pounder long guns; 6 × 8-pounder long guns

Pauline was a 44-gun Hortense-class frigate of the French Navy.

== Service history ==
On 27 February 1809, along with Pénélope, she captured the 32-gun HMS Proserpine. In October 1809, she sailed from Toulon to escort a convoy bound for Barcelona. Chased by a British squadron under Admiral Collingwood during the Battle of Maguelone, and sailing with Borée, she managed to repel and escape HMS Tigre and HMS Leviathan, and returned to Toulon after Amélie joined up.

Pauline was then used for convoy escort in the Mediterranean. She took part in the action of 29 November 1811, fleeing the battle while frigate Pomone and the smaller Persanne were captured by the British. Her commanding officer, Captain François-Gilles Montfort, was subsequently court-martialled for his failure to support these ships and relieved of command.

On 11 April 1814, she was renamed Bellone. She took part in the landing at Sidi Ferruch during the Invasion of Algiers in 1830, and was used as a ferry in the following years.

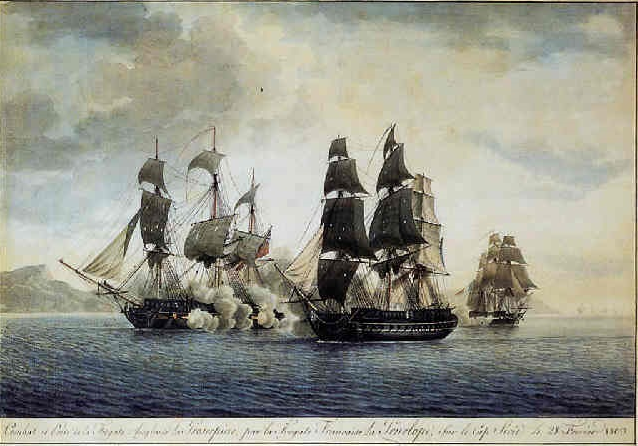
Capture of HMS Proserpine by Pénélope and Pauline. Watercolour by Antoine Roux.

== Sources and references ==
- Roche, Jean-Michel (2005). Dictionnaire des bâtiments de la flotte de guerre française de Colbert à nos jours, 1671–1870. Group Retozel-Maury Millau. p. 344. ISBN 978-2-9525917-0-6. OCLC 165892922.
- HMS Ambuscade website
