= Charlotte Green =

British radio broadcaster

- Born: 4 May 1956 (age 70)
- Education: University of Kent
- Occupations: Radio newsreader, announcer and presenter
- Years active: 1978–present
- Employer: BBC Radio

Charlotte Green (born 4 May 1956) is a British radio broadcaster and a former continuity announcer and news reader for BBC Radio 4.

After 1988, she specialised in news reading, including reading the news on the Radio 4 breakfast Today programme, and reading news items on The News Quiz. The Daily Telegraph described her as "the supreme Radio 4 announcer whose warm yet slightly formal tones were once voted the nation's favourite". Green left Radio 4 in January 2013. She read the classified football results on BBC Radio 5 Live and the World Service Sports Report from 2013 until 2022, succeeding James Alexander Gordon. Her autobiography The News is Read was published by The Robson Press in 2014.

== Early life ==
Green was educated at the independent Haberdashers' Aske's School for Girls in Elstree, followed by the University of Kent, where she gained a first-class BA in English and American Literature and was involved in university radio, before joining the BBC as a studio manager in 1978 at the World Service. She has said that "I wanted to be an actress, but I decided there were too many actresses around, so I joined the BBC."

== Broadcasting ==
After reading out letters for PM and You and Yours, she became a continuity announcer in 1985, and then a newsreader in 1988. She was a regular newsreader for the Today programme and the comedy programme The News Quiz. She also worked on PM and the Shipping Forecast. From 29 October 2005, she joined Chris Evans's Saturday afternoon show on Radio 2 to read phone numbers and announcements.

Her voice is a marvel, something to make one feel safe and secure, like being tucked up in bed with a hot water bottle.

— David Jewell, BJGP

In 2002, Green was voted the "Most Attractive Female Voice on National Radio" in a poll by the BBC's Radio Times publication. She has acknowledged the reliance that lonely listeners place in her; her habit of wishing listeners "a peaceful night" led many to send her letters.

In addition to newsreading, Green has been a presenter, including for a programme on church music, a classical music concert series, and a series on World Service news bulletins. She presented Notes & Queries with Clive Anderson on television.

Between 2003 and 2006, Green was unique in her pronunciation of the years between 2001 and 2009. She adopted the 'twenty-oh' method instead of 'two-thousand-and'. This was said to have sparked so many complaints that she reverted to 'two-thousand-and' in 2006.

She played herself in a 2005 radio episode of The Hitchhiker's Guide to the Galaxy, and again played herself in 2008 in Simon Brett's radio detective drama Charles Paris. She has been impersonated by Jan Ravens reading out a double-entendres-filled shipping forecast on the BBC radio comedy show Dead Ringers. She signed a public letter of protest to the BBC Trust regarding cuts to the radio news service in 2007.

Green has on occasions attracted some attention for inopportune giggling during on-air broadcasts. In March 2008, while announcing the death of American film and television writer Abby Mann, Green laughed after what is believed to be the world's earliest recording, played during the preceding item, was described off-air as sounding like "a bee trapped in a bottle".

In a 2012 interview, she named the fall of the Berlin Wall as the 'biggest' story that she'd ever read the news for. Green, and her colleague Harriet Cass, left Radio 4, having opted for voluntary redundancy owing to reorganisation. Green's final news bulletin was the six o'clock news on Friday 18 January 2013.

Green broadcast on Classic FM between April 2013 and December 2018 presenting Charlotte Green's Great Composers. A keen supporter of Tottenham Hotspur FC, in August 2013 it was announced that Green will follow James Alexander Gordon as the permanent announcer of Sports Report, the Saturday football results programme, on BBC Radio 5 Live. Green's new role, the first ever woman appointed to the post, began on 28 September 2013.

From July 2015, Green was a reader on the BBC Radio 4 panel game Quote... Unquote and featured on the programme's last edition in December 2021.

== Awards ==
- Roberts Radio Special Award for Excellence in Broadcasting (2009, Voice of the Listener and Viewer Awards for Excellence in Broadcasting)
- Radio Broadcaster of the Year (2013, Broadcasting Press Guild Awards)
- Honorary Doctorate in recognition of her contribution to radio broadcasting (2013, University of Kent)

== Personal life ==
Green is an avid reader and enjoys theatre, concerts and art exhibitions. She is also a Trustee of the University of Kent Development Fund.

== Bibliography ==
- Green, Charlotte (2007). "8: How to present a talk". In George Martin Hall (ed.). How to present at meetings (2 ed.). Wiley-Blackwell. pp. 51–4. ISBN 978-1-4051-3985-4.
- Green, Charlotte (2014). The News is Read. The Robson Press. ISBN 978-1-84954-691-1.

== Filmography ==
- Page Eight (2011)
