= French ship Persanne (1809) =

Storeship of the French Navy

History

France
- Name: Persane
- Namesake: Persia
- Ordered: Contract:16 March 1808; Ordered:25 April 1808
- Builder: Chicallat & Jouvin, Marseille
- Laid down: 1 June 1808
- Launched: September 1809
- Captured: 29 November 1811
- Fate: Sold to the Bey of Tunis

General characteristics
- Class & type: Var-class storeship
- Displacement: 800 tons (French; unladen)
- Length: Overall:135 ft 9 in (41.4 m); Keel:123 ft 8 in (37.7 m)
- Beam: 32 ft 0 in (9.8 m)
- Depth of hold: 16 ft 7 in (5.1 m)
- Propulsion: Sails
- Sail plan: Ship
- Complement: 101–159
- Armament: 22 × 8-pounder + 2 × 6-pounder guns
- Notes: All dimensions are for the class

Persane was a 24-gun storeship of the French Navy.

On 29 November 1811, Persane, under the command of Frigate Captain Satie, ferried a cargo of 201 bronze and iron cannon, 220 iron wheels for gun carriages, and numerous other military stores from Corfu to Trieste, escorted by frigates Pomone and Pauline. British Captain Murray Maxwell's squadron of three frigates intercepted the convoy. In the ensuing action of 29 November 1811, Persane fought for four hours before being captured. Pomone was also taken, while Pauline fled.

Persane was afterwards sold to the Beylik of Tunis.
