= PNS Tariq =

PNS Tariq may refer to one of the following ships of the Pakistan Navy:

- PNS Tariq (D129), the former British O-class destroyer HMS Offa (G29); acquired by the Pakistan Navy in 1949; scrapped in 1959
- PNS Tariq (D165), the former American Gearing-class destroyer USS Wiltsie (DD-716) launched in 1945; acquired by the Pakistan Navy in 1977; renamed Nazim in 1990
- PNS Tariq (D181), the former British Type 21 frigate HMS Ambuscade (F172); acquired by the Pakistan Navy in 1993
- PNS Tariq (F282), a Babur-class corvette
