= James Alexander Gordon =

Scottish radio broadcaster (1936–2014)

- Born: 10 February 1936; Edinburgh, Scotland
- Died: 18 August 2014 (aged 78); Reading, England
- Occupation: Radio broadcaster
- Years active: 1972–2013
- Spouse: Julia
- Children: 1

James Alexander Gordon (10 February 1936 – 18 August 2014) was a Scottish radio broadcaster, best known for reading out football results on BBC radio.

Born in Edinburgh in 1936, as a baby he was paralysed with polio and he spent a large part of his childhood in hospital. He worked in music publishing before joining the BBC in 1972, becoming an announcer and newsreader (mostly on Radio 2) until the early 1990s. In 1974 he followed in the footsteps of John Webster, reading the classified football results, first on Radio 2 and later on BBC Radio 5 Live.

Popularly known as "Jag", he used his intonation, when pronouncing the names of the clubs, to indicate whether a match had ended in a home win, away win or draw.

Gordon also worked as a freelance voice artist, recording voice-overs and commenting on company videos. He also recorded a sequence of fictional football results to introduce each scene in performances of Tom Wells' 2013 play, Jumpers for Goalposts.

He announced his retirement from radio in July 2013 following surgery to remove his larynx after being diagnosed with cancer which rendered his voice too weak for broadcasting. He was succeeded as the reader of the classified football results by former Radio 4 newsreader Charlotte Green from late September 2013.

== Death ==
Gordon died of cancer on 18 August 2014, at the Sue Ryder Duchess of Kent Hospice in Reading.
