= French frigate Pomone (1805) =

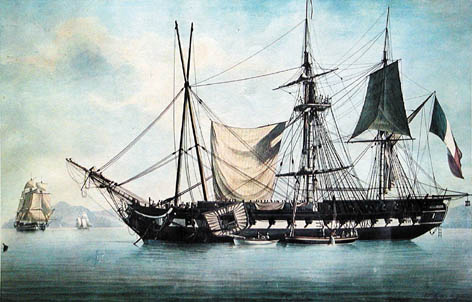
- Pomone off Toulon

History

France
- Name: Pomone
- Namesake: Pomona
- Builder: Genoa
- Laid down: August 1803
- Launched: 10 February 1805
- Captured: 29 November 1811

United Kingdom
- Name: Ambuscade
- Acquired: 29 November 1811
- Decommissioned: 1812
- Fate: Broken up 1812

General characteristics
- Class & type: Hortense-class frigate
- Length: 48.75 m (159 ft 11 in)
- Beam: 12.2 m (40 ft 0 in)
- Draught: 5.9 m (19 ft 4 in)
- Sail plan: Full-rigged ship
- Armament: 40 guns; 26 × 18-pounder long guns; 6 × 8-pounder long guns

Pomone was a 40-gun Hortense-class frigate of the French Navy, built at Genoa for the puppet government of the Ligurian Republic, which was annexed as part of France in June 1805, a month after Pomone was completed. On 30 January 1807, she collided with the Muiron.

In May 1807, Pomone, Annibal, Incorruptible and the corvette Victorieuse engaged HMS Spartan off Cabrera in the Mediterranean.

== Capture and fate ==
Pomone was captured near Corfu during the action of 29 November 1811 and briefly added to the Royal Navy as HMS Ambuscade, although she was never brought into service. She was broken up for material in November 1812 at Woolwich Dockyard.

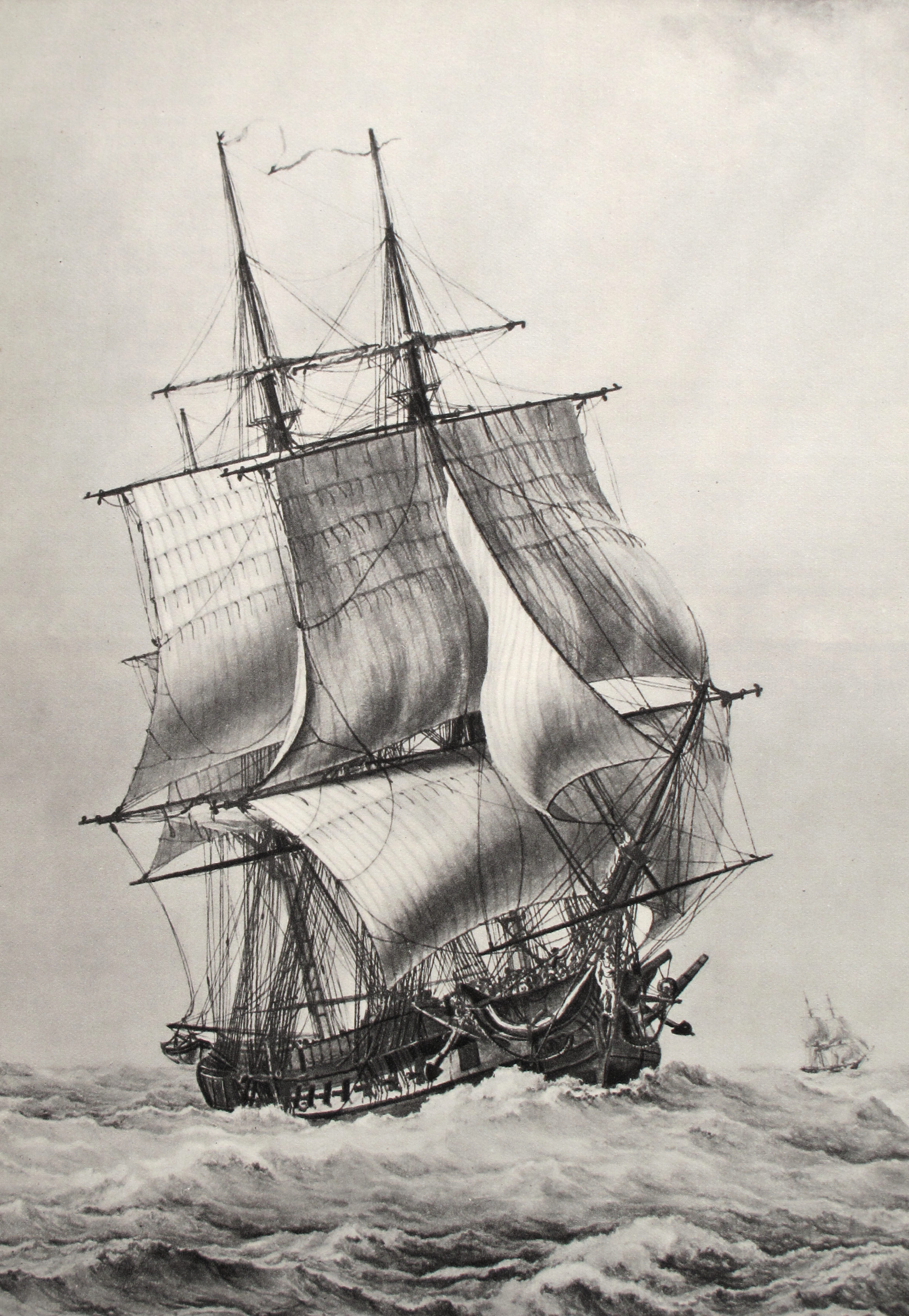
French frigate Pomone
