= HMS Saint Pierre =

Sloop of the Royal Navy

History

France
- Name: Saint Pierre
- Builder: Bordeaux
- Renamed: 1803:Eure; 1803:Saint Pierre; 1805:Diligente
- Captured: 9 February 1809

United Kingdom
- Name: HMS Saint Pierre
- Namesake: Saint-Pierre, Martinique
- Acquired: 9 February 1809 by capture
- Fate: Sold 1 September 1814

General characteristics
- Displacement: 240 tons (French)
- Tons burthen: 371 (bm)
- Armament: 18 guns

HMS Saint Pierre was launched in 1803 at Bordeaux as Saint Pierre, intended for use as a slave ship. The Department of Eure purchased her and donated her to the French government, which, however, found her unsuitable and returned her to her owner. The French Navy later requisitioned her between July and September 1805 as a storeship and renamed her Diligente. She was at Martinique in February 1809 when the British Royal Navy captured the island. The Royal Navy took her into service as HMS Saint Pierre.

== French career ==
The ship was launched in 1803 at Bordeaux as Saint Pierre, intended for use as a slave ship. The Department of Eure purchased her in August or September to donate her to the French government for use as an 18-gun corvette. They were to deliver her on 24 September but the government found her unsuitable and returned her to her owner. By the time she returned to mercantile service war with England was well underway and Saint Pierre apparently did not sail in the slave trade. (Note: The most complete database of the Trans-Atlantic slave trade has no vessel named Eure, or relevant St Pierre.) The French Navy later requisitioned her between July and September 1805 as a storeship and renamed her Diligente.

On 9 August 1808 the French corvette Sylphe, under the command of capitaine de frégate M. Louis Marie Clément, (a Member of the Legion of Honour), sailed with Diligente and Espiègle, to carry supplies from Lorient to Guadeloupe. On 11 August they encountered HMS Comet. The French, under orders to avoid combat, attempted to escape. Diligente out-sailed her two consorts. Comet caught up with the two laggards, with Espiègle ahead. Comet then engaged Sylphe, capturing her near the Île d'Yeu, though Espiègle escaped. The British took Sylphe into Royal Navy service as HMS Seagull, but never commissioned her.

A few days later, on 16 August HMS Sibylle captured Espiègle. She was later recommissioned in the Royal Navy as Electra.

Diligente out-sailed her companions and arrived in Martinique. There she was recommissioned. Lloyd's List reported that the corvette Diligent had been armed with 20 guns and had a crew of 150 men. She had been carrying flour to Martinique.

On 23 February 1809 the British captured Martinique, and with it Diligente, captured at St Pierre on 9 February.

== Royal Navy ==
The Royal Navy renamed their prize HMS Saint Pierre. Commander Alexander Kennedy commissioned her in June 1809. (Note: St Pierre was already in British service at the time of the surrender of Martinique and her crew qualified to share in the prize money for the surrender of the island.) In 1810 she came under the command of Commander Samuel George Pechell. She arrived at Portsmouth on 9 July 1810 and was laid up.

== Fate ==
The "Principal Officers and Commissioners of His Majesty's Navy" offered "St. Pierre sloop, of 371 tons", "lying at Portsmouth", for sale on 16 March 1814. She finally sold there, for £500, on 1 September 1814.
