= French corvette Diligente (1801) =

Diligente
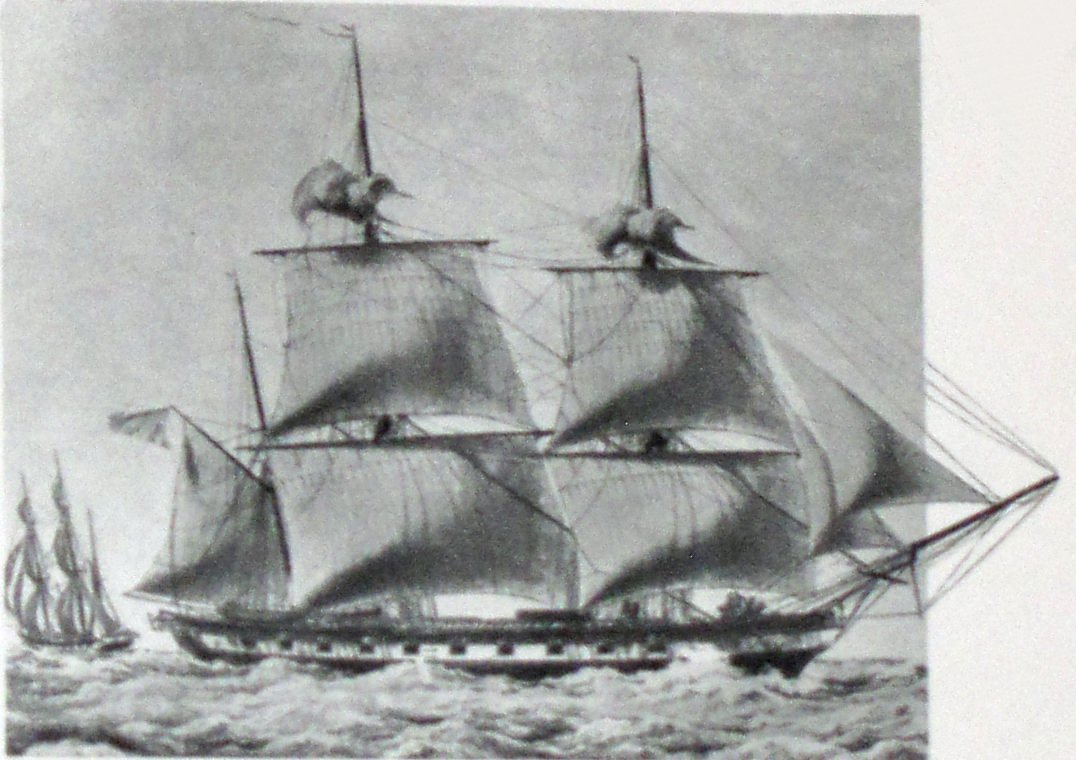

History

France
- Name: Diligente
- Ordered: 5 December 1800 (to Ozanne's own account)
- Builder: Brest
- Laid down: 20 June 1800 (to Ozanne's own account)
- Launched: 7 November 1801
- Commissioned: 23 September 1801
- Stricken: 11 October 1854
- Fate: Struck off 1854

General characteristics
- Class & type: Diligente-class corvette
- Length: Gun deck: 33.78 m (110 ft 10 in); Keel:29.885 m (98 ft 0.6 in)
- Beam: 8.45 m (27 ft 9 in)
- Draught: 4.66 m (15 ft 3 in)
- Complement: 114/141
- Armament: Gun deck: Originally: 14 × 6-pounder guns + 6 × 12-pounder carronades; In 1808: 18 × 24-pounder carronades + 2 × 12-pounder long guns; Refit 1821: 18 × 18-pounder carronades + 2 × 8-pounder long guns
- Armour: Timber

Diligente was a 20-gun corvette of the French Navy, lead ship of her class. Built at Brest on private plans by Pierre Ozanne, she was particularly fast. The French Navy adopted the design and copied the plans as late as 1848. Originally armed with 6-pounder guns, she was later rearmed with heavier carronades. She continued in service, off and on, until she was struck in 1854.

== Service history ==
=== French Revolutionary and Napoleonic Wars ===
Diligente took part in the Atlantic campaign of 1806 in Leissègues' squadron, culminating in the Battle of San Domingo.

The frigates Comète, Félicité, and Diligente captured and burned the American vessel Lark, Moore, master, which was sailing from Philadelphia to Jamaica. (Note: The report in Lloyd's List refers to the "brig Diligente". The French Navy had a brig Diligent, but she was not in the area.)

In August 1808 Diligente, captained by Commander Jean-François Lemaresquier, with the corvettes Sylphe and Espiègle, sailed from France with supplies for the island of Martinique. British ships chased the group through the Bay of Biscay and captured Sylphe and Espiègle. Diligente escaped, only to encounter the British sloop Recruit, under Commander (later to be Admiral) Charles Napier, off Antigua. During a hard-fought action lasting three hours, Recruit's mainmast fell, putting her somewhat at Diligente's mercy. However, a lucky shot ignited Diligente's ammunition store, causing some damage. Diligente withdrew and later Lemaresquier justified his action on the grounds that other British naval vessels were approaching, which they were not, and the weight of Recruit's broadside, which was heavier.

On 3 October, Diligente sank the Mexican brig Juliana. Then on 12 November she returned to Lorient. Here she served from 1811 to 1812 as a school ship. On 12 March she was in the harbour at Brest. On 2 December 1812, she accidentally collided with Nestor in the Roads of Toulon.

She may have cruised in the Channel as Derwent reported that on 20 December 1813 she had retaken and sent in the brig Racehorse, from Newfoundland for Teignmouth, that the French corvette Diligente had captured. In 1814 Diligente was paid off.

=== Bourbon Restoration ===
After the Bourbon Restoration, Diligente underwent refitting at Brest between 22 August 1820 and 4 January 1821. She was recommissioned with 18-pounder carronades and was reclassified as a corvette aviso (sloop corvette). Then on 21 April she left Brest for the Antilles, Guiana and Newfoundland. By 30 August 1822 she was in the Antilles again.

On 2 November 1822 Diligente left Rochefort for Brazil, not returning to Brest until 27 December 1826. Around 1825 or so she was off the coast of Chile where she took a privateer that had fired a broadside at her.

In 1827 Diligente was again decommissioned for refitting. Then in 1828 she was in the Eastern Mediterranean.

=== July Monarchy ===
Under Commandant Garibou Diligente took part in the expedition to the mouth of the Tagus River where a French squadron fought the Battle of the Tagus on 11 July 1831. The French vessels fought their way past the Portuguese forts guarding the mouth of the river and sailed up to Lisbon. There they forced the Portuguese king Dom Miguel to accede to French demands, among them that he recognize the July Monarchy. The French also seized all the military and commercial vessels they could find as reparations.

Then in 1835–36 Diligente was on the Livorno station. On 30 January 1836, she was driven ashore and severely damaged at Livorno. On 26 October 1840 she left Toulon for Alexandria, Egypt. She visited Smyrna in March 1841. Lastly, she was present at Athens during the 3 September 1843 Revolution.

=== Fate ===
Diligente was struck off on 11 October 1854.
