= French brig Néarque =

Abeille-class brig

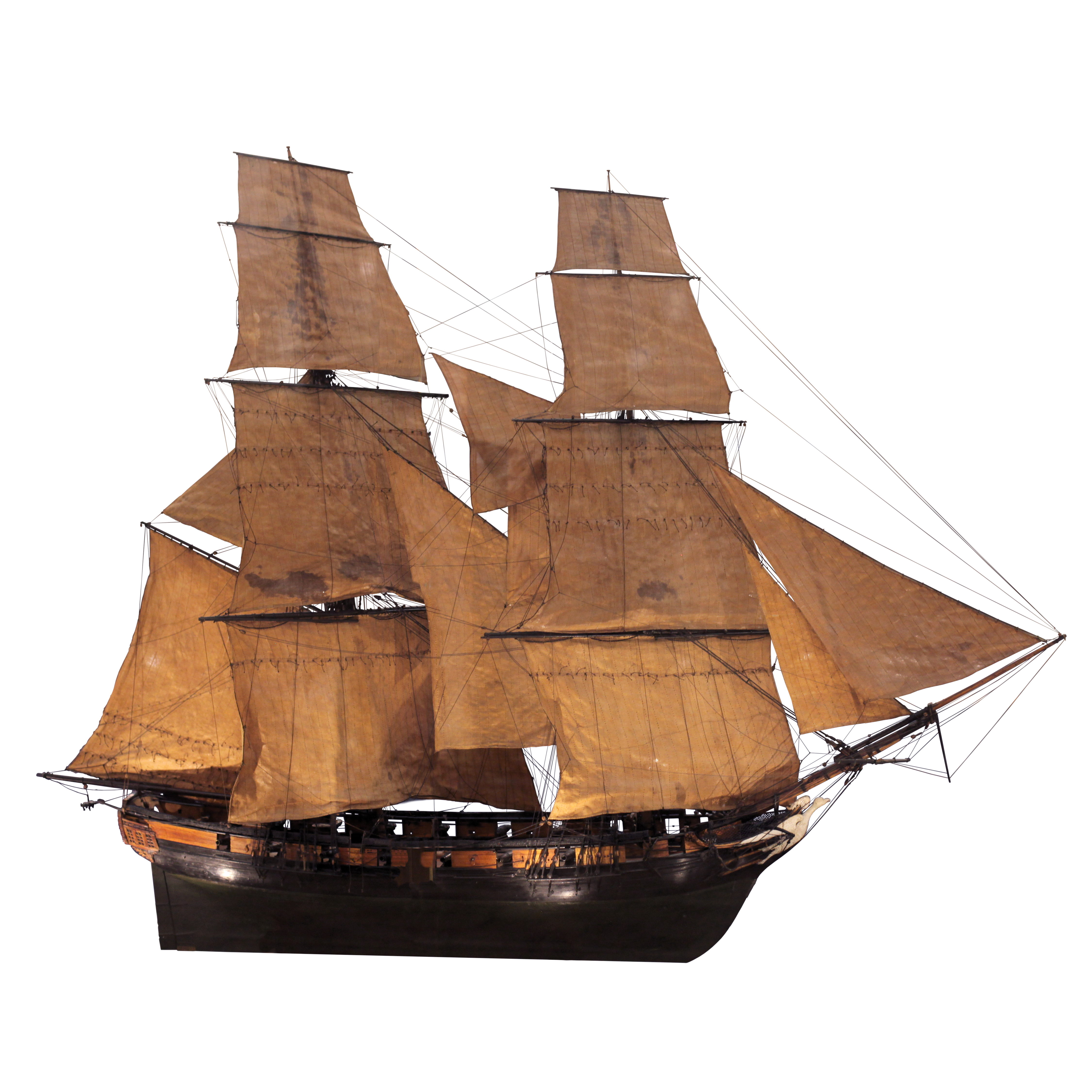
- 1/36 scale model of Cygne, sister-ship of Néarque, on display at the Musée national de la Marine in Paris

History

France
- Name: Néarque
- Namesake: Nearchus, a mentor of Alexander the Great and a noted sailor
- Builder: Lorient Dyd-Caudan, by Louis, Antoine, & Mathurin Crucy
- Laid down: June 1803
- Launched: 27 March 1804
- Completed: July 1804
- Captured: March 1806

United Kingdom
- Name: HMS Nearque
- Acquired: March 1806 by capture
- Fate: Sold 1814

General characteristics
- Class & type: Abeille-class Brig
- Displacement: 290 tons (French)
- Tons burthen: 309 (31041/94 by calc.) (bm),
- Length: 92 ft 4 in (28.1 m) (overall); 72 ft 7 1/8 in (22.1 m) (keel)
- Beam: 28 ft 4 1/2 in (8.649 m)
- Depth of hold: 7 ft 6 in (2.29 m)
- Sail plan: Brig
- Complement: French service: c. 100; British service: 110
- Armament: French service: 16 guns; British service: 14 × 24-pounder carronades + 2 × 6-pounder bow chasers

The French brig Néarque was an Abeille-class brig launched at Lorient in 1804. She made a voyage to the Caribbean in 1805. After the frigate HMS Niobe captured her in March 1806, the Royal Navy took her into Plymouth, but laid her up in ordinary. She then disappears from the records until her sale in 1814.

== French career ==
From June 1803 lieutenant de vaisseau Jean-Philippe-Paul Jourdain remained at Lorient to supervise the construction of Néarque. He would remain her commander until the British captured her.

On 27 April 1805, Jourdain and Néarque captured the British 16-gun brig Heros after an engagement that lasted half an hour and in which Jourdain sustained two wounds. (Note: There is no record of a British letter of marque by that name, and no warship. However, in April 1801, Atalante captured a French 14-gun privateer brig of that name.)

Between early September 1805 and end-December, Néarque carried dispatches from Lorient to Martinique and back, then troops from Belle Île to Lorient, patrolled the southern coast of Brittany, and escorted a convoy from Lorient to Bénodet, returning to Lorient. Then in February 1806, she sailed from Groix to Concarneau.

== Capture and fate ==
On 28 March a French squadron composed of the two 40-gun frigates Revanche, Commodore Amand Leduc, and Guerrière, Captain Paul-Mathieu Hubert, 36-gun frigate Sirène, Captain Alexandre Lambert, and Néarque, sailed from Lorient, on a cruise off the coast of Iceland, Greenland, and Spitzbergen, for the purpose of destroying British and Russian whaling ships. It quickly became evident that Néarque was a far worse sailer than the frigates and that she could not follow; Leduc detached her so that she would carry out her orders independently.

At about 10a.m. Niobe, Captain John Wentworth Loring, cruising between the Glénans and the isle of Groix, discovered the French squadron. He followed and at 10p.m. was able to capture the sternmost, which was Nearque. He reported that she had 97 men on board and stores and provisions for a five-month cruise. James reports that although Nearque made signals, the three French frigates continued on their mission, leaving her to her fate. Furthermore, she surrendered after a volley of small arms fire from Niobe that "fortunately injured no one".

Lloyd's List reported Nearque's arrival at Plymouth, and gave her complement as 103 men. It further reported that Glory and Niobe had continued in pursuit of the rest of the French squadron.

Nearque arrived in Plymouth on 3 April 1806. The Royal Navy never commissioned her; instead, the Admiralty placed her in ordinary. The commissioners of the Navy put her up for sale at Plymouth in July 1814. She sold there on 21 July for £400.
