= French ship Nestor =

At least two ships of the French Navy have been named Nestor:

- French ship Nestor (1793) a Téméraire-class ship of the line launched in 1793, renamed Cisalpin in 1797 and Aquilon 1803. Captured and burnt 1809
- French ship Nestor (1810) a Téméraire-class ship of the line launched in 1810 and broken up before 1865
