= HMS Alceste (1806) =

French Navy ship

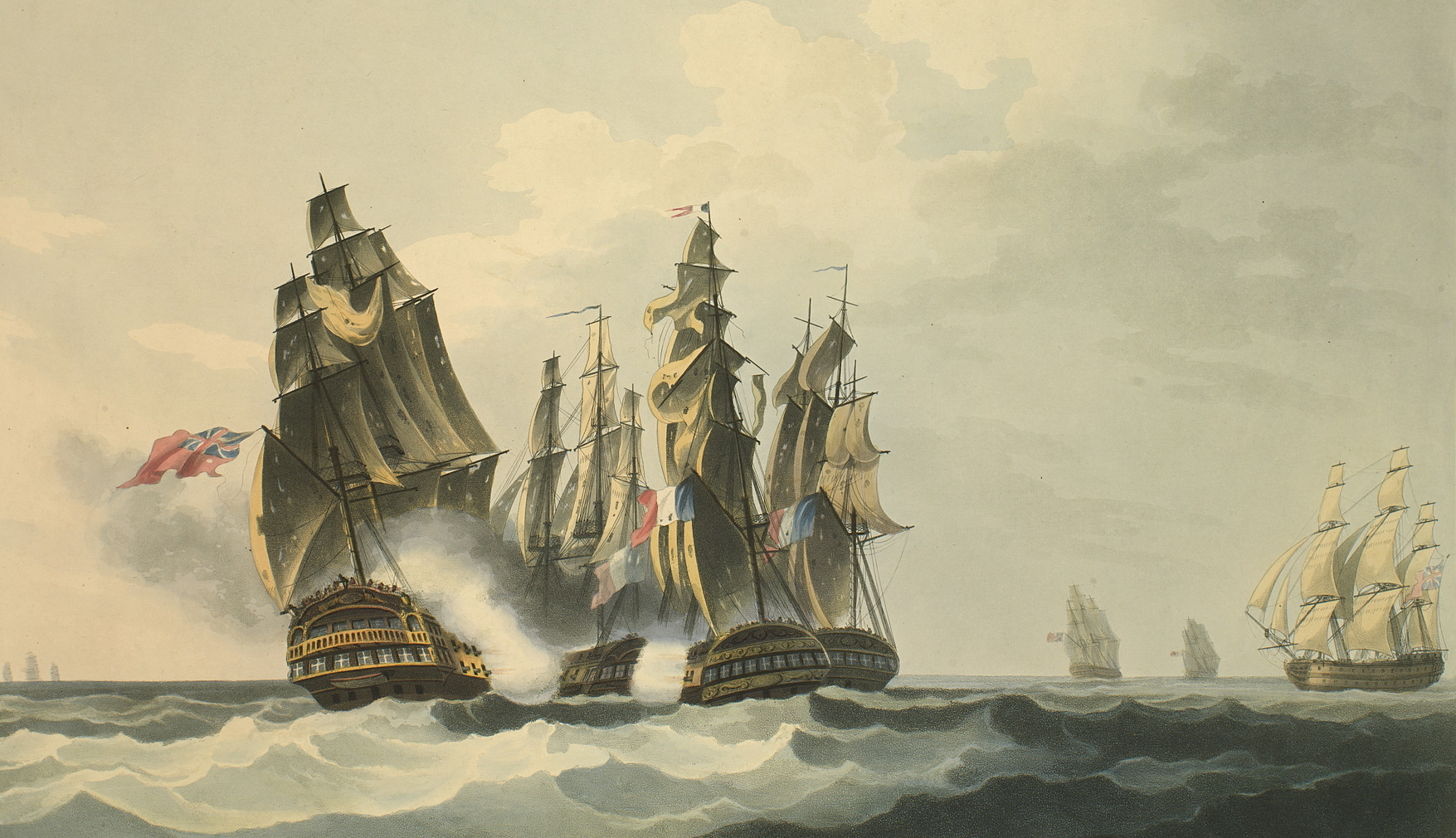
- Minerve (second from left) at the action of 25 September 1806

History

France
- Name: Minerve
- Builder: Rochefort
- Laid down: May 1804
- Launched: 9 September 1805
- Completed: November 1805
- Captured: By the British on 25 September 1806

United Kingdom
- Name: HMS Alceste
- Acquired: Captured on 25 September 1806
- Commissioned: March 1807
- Reclassified: Troopship in 1814
- Fate: Wrecked on 18 February 1817, wreck then burned on 22 February

General characteristics
- Class & type: 38-gun Armide-class frigate; re-rated as 46 guns in 1817
- Displacement: 1430 tonneaux
- Tons burthen: 759 port tonneaux; 1,09771/94 (bm)
- Length: 152 ft 5 in (46.5 m) (overall); 128 ft 8 in (39.2 m) (keel)
- Beam: 40 ft (12.2 m)
- Draught: 12 ft 8 in (3.9 m)
- Propulsion: Sails
- Sail plan: Full-rigged ship
- Complement: 284 (later 315)
- Armament: UD: 28 × 18-pounder guns QD: 14 × 32-pounder carronades Fc: 2 × 9-pounder guns and 2 × 32-pounder carronades

HMS Alceste was built at Rochefort in 1804 for the French Navy as Minerve, an Armide-class frigate. In the spring of 1806, prior to her capture, she engaged HMS Pallas, then under Lord Cochrane. During the duel she ran aground but Cochrane had to abort his attack when French reinforcements appeared.

The British captured her in an action on 25 September 1806, and the Royal Navy took Minerve into service as Alceste in March 1807; Alceste then continued to serve throughout the Napoleonic Wars. On 29 November 1811, Alceste led a British squadron that captured a French military convoy carrying more than 200 cannon to Trieste in the Balkans. After this loss, Napoleon changed the direction of his planned eastward expansion in 1812 from the Balkans to Russia. The British historian James Henderson has suggested that the two events were linked, and may have changed the course of the war.

In 1814, Alceste was converted to a troopship and used to transport British soldiers to North America during the War of 1812. Following the Treaty of Paris in 1815, Alceste carried Lord Amherst on his 1816 diplomatic mission to China. On the return journey, she struck a reef in the Java Sea; her wreck was subsequently plundered and burned by Malayan pirates.

== Construction and armament ==
Alceste was built to a design by Pierre Rolland for the French Navy as Minerve, an Armide-class frigate. Her construction began at Rochefort in May 1804, she was launched in September 1805 and finished that November. Measuring 152 feet 5 inches (46.46 m) along her gundeck with a beam of 40 feet 0 inches (12.19 m) and a depth in the hold of 12 feet 8 inches (3.86 m); she had a capacity of 1,097 71/94 tons burthen. When first fitted out, Minerve carried twenty-eight 18 pounders (8.2 kg) as her main battery and fourteen 32-pounder (15 kg) carronades on her quarter-deck; her forecastle had two 9-pounder (4.1 kg) long guns and two 32-pounder (15 kg) carronades.

== French service ==
Minerve was initially commanded by Capitaine Jaques Collet, entering service during the early days of the War of the Fourth Coalition between Britain and her allies, and Napoleonic France. In April 1806 she was part of a squadron—under Contre-amiral Zacharie Allemand and comprising five ships-of-the-line, five frigates, and four smaller vessels—anchored under the shore batteries of the Île-d'Aix awaiting the opportunity to put to sea. The British knew the location of Allemand's squadron; on 25 April Admiral Edward Thornbrough, sent the British frigate Pallas close to the Île-d'Aix to count the enemy vessels. Allemand ordered Minerve and three corvettes, Lynx, Sylphe, and Palinure, to meet the British frigate, leading to a skirmish in which no ship incurred much damage. Three other British vessels subsequently approached—the frigate Iris, the 16-gun sloop Hazard, and a cutter—and Capitaine Collet ended the engagement by sailing Minerve to a position under the shelter of the island's guns.

Pallas returned on 12 May with Indefatigable and a 16-gun ship-sloop, Kingfisher. Allemande despatched two large frigates and three corvettes; facing unfavourable winds, the British withdrew. Two days later, Pallas and Kingfisher came back and Allemande again ordered Minerve, Lynx, Sylphe, and Palinure to chase Cochrane off. As a precaution, he also had two other large frigates, Armide and Infatigable, cleared for action and ready to go. Collett ordered his ships to set all sail in the hope of catching Pallas before she could escape, but Cochrane was in no hurry to leave and even attempted to draw the French on by backing his topsails and slowing down. Once in range, Pallas opened fire, bringing down the topsail yard of one of the smaller vessels and then retreating into nearby shoals with Minerve in pursuit. By 13:00 Minerve had come up on the leeward side of Pallas, whereupon Pallas fired into her and closed with the intention of boarding. Just at that moment, Minerve hit a sandbank and Pallas crashed into her. (Note: A single French account claims that Minerve did not run aground but that her anchor fell, causing her to stop abruptly. The British naval historian William James considers this unlikely as she would not have needed re-floating but could simply have cut her cable.) The force of the collision, great enough to jolt Pallas's guns from their positions, did not prevent her from unleashing a devastating broadside. Both ships were damaged but Pallas's shallower draught prevented her grounding. Her crew were able to disengage and get back under way, having seen the two 40-gun French frigates, Armide and Infatigable, drawing near. The crew of Kingfisher sailed in to take Pallas in tow; the latter had lost her fore topmast, jib-boom, spritsail, stunsail, and main topsail yards. Minerve was only lightly damaged; she was re-floated and taken to Rochefort for repair. The engagement cost the lives of seven seamen aboard Minerve, with a further fourteen injured. There were a further one dead and five wounded aboard Pallas.

=== Capture ===
By September 1806 Minerve had joined a squadron—along with the large frigates Armide, Gloire, Infatigable, and Thémis, and the brig-corvettes Lynx and Sylphe—under Eléon-Jean-Nicolas Soleil. The squadron left Rochefort on 24 September 1806, bound for the West Indies. At 01:00 on 25 September Soleil's squadron were spotted near the Chassiron lighthouse by a powerful British force under Samuel Hood, comprising five 74-gun ships (Centaur, Achille, Monarch, Revenge, and Mars), the 98-gun Windsor Castle, and the 16-gun brig Atalante. The French sought to avoid engagement, turning to the south-south-west with the British in general pursuit. After three hours the fastest British ship, Monarch, was within range of Armide. The next nearest British ship was Centaur, over eight miles further back; seeing an opportunity, four of the French frigates fled. Infatigable, set off north but was pursued and later caught by Mars; Thémis and the two brigs headed south and eventually escaped.

The remaining French frigates closed-up for mutual protection. At 10:00, Monarch engaged Minerve and Armide, as the weather prevented Monarch from opening her lower gun ports, she was badly mauled. An hour later, Centaur caught up and began firing at Armide and Gloire, leaving Monarch to continue her fight with Minerve. Armide struck to Centaur at 11:45 and Minerve surrendered to Monarch shortly after. Gloire veered west in an attempt to throw her pursuers but Centaur and Mars chased her down and forced her to strike at 15:00.

== British service ==
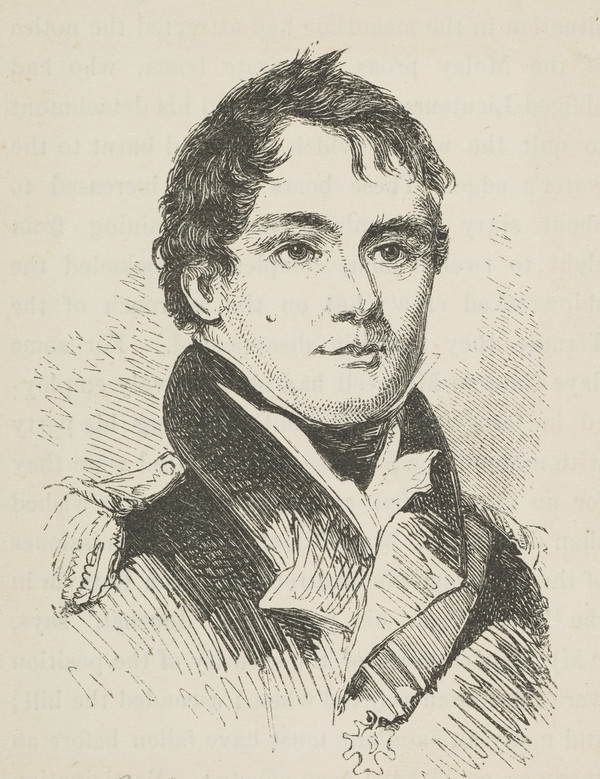
Captain Murray Maxwell sketched by Thomas Charles Wageman in 1817

The captured Minerve arrived at Plymouth on 26 October 1806, and after languishing there for some months, was taken into service as HMS Alceste. Commissioned in March 1807 under Captain Murray Maxwell and refitted between April and August, she was sent to the Mediterranean in December. Following the French invasion of Portugal in November 1807, a British expedition to capture the island of Madeira was proposed. Admiral Samuel Hood's squadron—comprising ships-of-the-line, Centaur, York, Captain and Intrepid, and the frigates Alceste, Africaine, Shannon, and Success—escorted troopships into Funchal Bay on 24 December. The island was peacefully occupied two days later.

In the action of 4 April 1808, Alceste, with Mercury and Grasshopper, attacked a Spanish convoy off Rota. While at anchor about three miles to the north-west of the San Sebastián lighthouse, the British ships noticed the large convoy, escorted by 20 gun-boats and sailing close to the land so as to also benefit from the protection of a mobile artillery following on the shore. Coming under heavy fire, the three ships closed with the convoy at around 16:00. Grasshopper, requiring less water than the frigates, was able to stand in close to the town and bombard the batteries there, while Alceste and Mercury concentrated their fire on the gun-boats, destroying two of the escorts and driving many of the merchants ashore. Seven were subsequently captured and sailed back out to sea by marines and sailors of the British ships.

In 1808, with Napoleon controlling much of Europe, a plan was conceived by Sir Robert Adair, ambassador to Venice, to extract Pope Pius VII from Rome. It was thought that the Pope in exile could encourage the Catholic countries of Spain and Italy to rise up against Napoleon. Admiral Collingwood, Commander-in-Chief of the Mediterranean Fleet, dispatched Alceste and an 18-gun sloop, Acorn, to Palermo where they arrived on 12 August. The British diplomat there, William Drummond, selected four priests willing to undertake the mission. They boarded Alceste and set sail on 26 August. On 31 August boats from Alceste put the party ashore at Ostia, near Rome, where they made contact with a representative of the Vatican who agreed to speak to the Pope but failed to return. When it was deemed necessary to travel to Rome to re-establish contact, the priests refused to go. Maxwell sent them back to Palermo in Acorn, which returned a week later with another volunteer of Drummond's. Landed on the night of 19 September, the envoy was captured and shot as a spy the following day. Consequently, the entire plan was abandoned.

On 22 May 1810, Alceste encountered some French feluccas—lightly armed merchant vessels with lateen rigs—that were forced to seek refuge under the guns of the bay of Agay. Under cover of darkness, two boats from Alceste, one under Lieutenant Andrew Wilson, the other led by the ship's master, Henry Bell, attacked the shore batteries. This was only partially successful; Wilson was unable to achieve his objective, while Bell's section managed to spike the guns of the second battery but only after taking heavy fire. Alceste stood out to sea for three days, and on the night of 25 May, Maxwell sent two armed boats to lay in wait in a rocky cove. The following morning Alceste set sail. The French, assuming Alceste had gone, attempted to leave, but the two British boats lying in ambush attacked. Despite fierce resistance and fire from the guns on shore, four ships of the French convoy were captured and two driven on to the rocks. The remainder made it safely back to their anchorage.

Boats of Alceste and Topaze captured two vessels in the bay of Martino, Corsica on 21 June 1810. (Note: This may be San-Martino-di-Lota, near Bastia.) Protecting the entrance to the bay was a three-gun battery, which a landing party captured and put out of action. Several of the garrison were wounded or killed during the attack. British casualties amounted to one killed and two wounded.

In 1811, Alceste entered the Adriatic and on 4–5 May, she and Belle Poule participated in a raid at Parenza (Istria). Having chased a brig into the harbour, but unable to follow due to the rocks and shallow water, the two frigates stood outside and opened fire on her and the battery protecting her. After an hour, the brig was forced to move nearer the shore, out of range. At 23:00, the British landed 200 seamen and all their marines on an island nearby, and also landed two 9-pounders and two howitzers that they placed in one battery, and a field piece that they placed further away. From there, they were able to engage the French in Parenza in a five-hour mutual bombardment. The brig was eventually destroyed and the men and cannons returned to their ships. Belle Poule had one man killed and three wounded, and Alceste had two men killed during the action. All casualties occurred ashore.

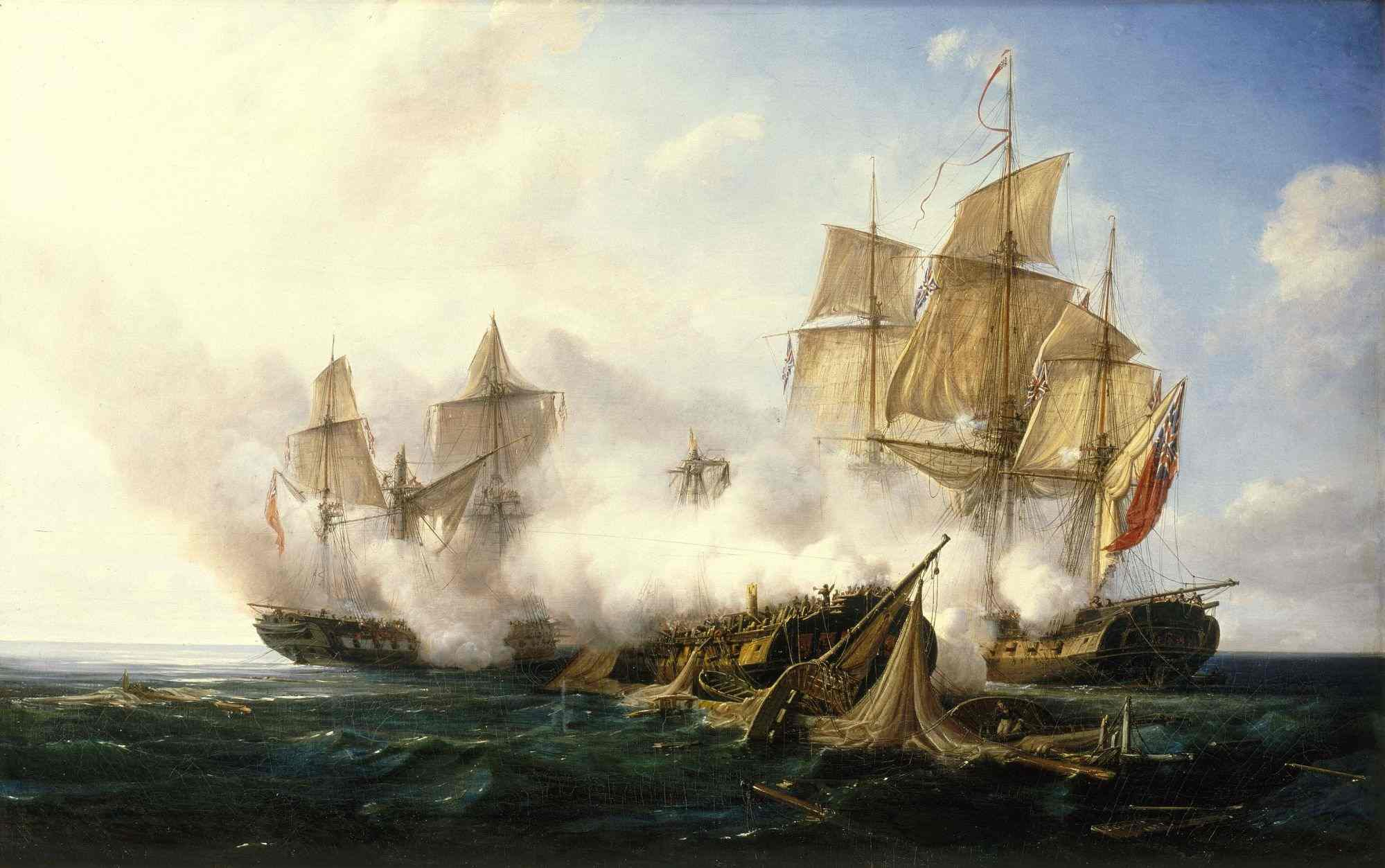
French frigate Pomone engaging with Alceste and Active on 29 November 1811. Painting by Pierre Julien Gilbert

At the action of 29 November 1811, Alceste led the British frigate squadron that outran and defeated a French military convoy carrying a cargo of cannon. The day before, Alceste had been stationed at the island of Lissa (now Vis), with the frigates Unité and Active, when word was received of a similar sized French squadron heading north. The British frigates could not immediately set sail because Maxwell feared an attack from a strong French force nearby. As a defence, he placed two batteries on an island in the harbour's entrance, manned by the ships' marines, and three previously captured gun-boats manned by around 30 seamen from Alceste and Active. These precautions not only weakened but delayed Maxwell's squadron, which put to sea at 19:00, twelve hours later.

The British eventually caught up with the French ships at 10:00 the following morning, identifying them as the two large frigates Pomone and Pauline, and the smaller Persanne. Persanne, fired the first shots at 12:30, off the coast of Pelagosa (Palagruža); an hour later Alceste and Pomone exchanged shots from their bow and stern guns respectively. Alceste began to overhaul Pomone at 13:40 and fired a broadside into her while simultaneously spreading more sail in the hope of catching Pauline, a little further ahead. This plan was thwarted though when a shot from Pomone brought down Alceste's main topmast, slowing her suddenly. When Active arrived at 14:00 and also started firing into Pomone, Pauline was obliged to come about to protect her now out-gunned colleague. Just after 15:00 the British sloop, Kingfisher appeared on the horizon and Pauline, now in danger of capture herself, disengaged and sailed off. Pomone struck shortly after. Unité which had set off in pursuit of Persanne, forced Persanne to surrender at 16:00 after a single exchange of broadsides.

The captured frigates contained more than 200 cannon, which were being transported to Trieste, a city in north-east Italy on the border of the Balkan States. (Note: Persanne, a 26-gun ship of 860 tons, carried a cargo of 130 × 24-pounder and 20 × 9-pounder cannons. Pomone's hold contained 51 cannons, the majority of which were 18-pounders, plus 220 gun-carriage wheels. It is not known for certain whether Pauline also bore a shipment of guns but sources agree that she probably carried a similar amount to Pomone.) It has been suggested by the British historian James Henderson that this action was a factor in Napoleon's decision to change the direction of his planned eastward expansion in 1812 from the Balkans to Russia.

In late 1812, Alceste was decommissioned and placed in ordinary at Deptford. Between February and July 1814 she was converted at Deptford into a troopship; in this role, she was recommissioned in May 1814 under Commander Faniel Lawrence. On 18 September 1814 she departed Plymouth as part of a squadron, with Bedford as flagship, that carried the advance guard of Major General Keane's army, which was moving to attack New Orleans. Following the British decision to attack New Orleans; Alceste left Pensacola on 8 December 1814, in tandem with the 50 other vessels under Vice-Admiral Alexander Cochrane. The point chosen to land the troops was at the head of Lake Borgne which was subsequently discovered to be guarded by five American gunboats, a sloop and a schooner. (Note: The gunboats were between 75 and 129 tons burthen; the largest carried a 24-pound long gun mounted on a pivot, four 12-pounder carronades and four swivels guns. The other four each carried a 32-pound long gun, six 6-pound long guns, two 5-inch howitzers, and four swivels. The other two smaller vessels bore only one gun each.) On 14 December, Cochrane dispatched nearly 1,000 men in 42 barges from the various ships under his command, including Alceste. After rowing for almost 36 hours, the British stopped just out of range to rest and eat breakfast before launching their attack. The Battle of Lake Borgne resulted in the capture of all the American vessels, at a cost of 94 British and 41 American dead and wounded. In 1847 the Admiralty issued a clasp (or bar) marked "14 Dec. Boat Service 1814" to survivors of the boat service who claimed the clasp to the Naval General Service Medal. (Note: The 'Names of Ships for which Claims have been proved' are as follows: warships Tonnant, Norge, Royal Oak, Ramillies, Bedford, Armide, Cydnus, Trave, Seahorse, Sophie, Meteor; troopships Gorgon, Diomede, Alceste, Belle Poule)

On 17 May 1815 Alceste arrived at Portsmouth, from the coast of America. On 6 June 1815, Thames, with Hydra and Alceste, departed Portsmouth and sailed for Quebec, arriving there on 26 July. They returned on 26 August, arriving at Plymouth.

=== Diplomatic mission to China ===
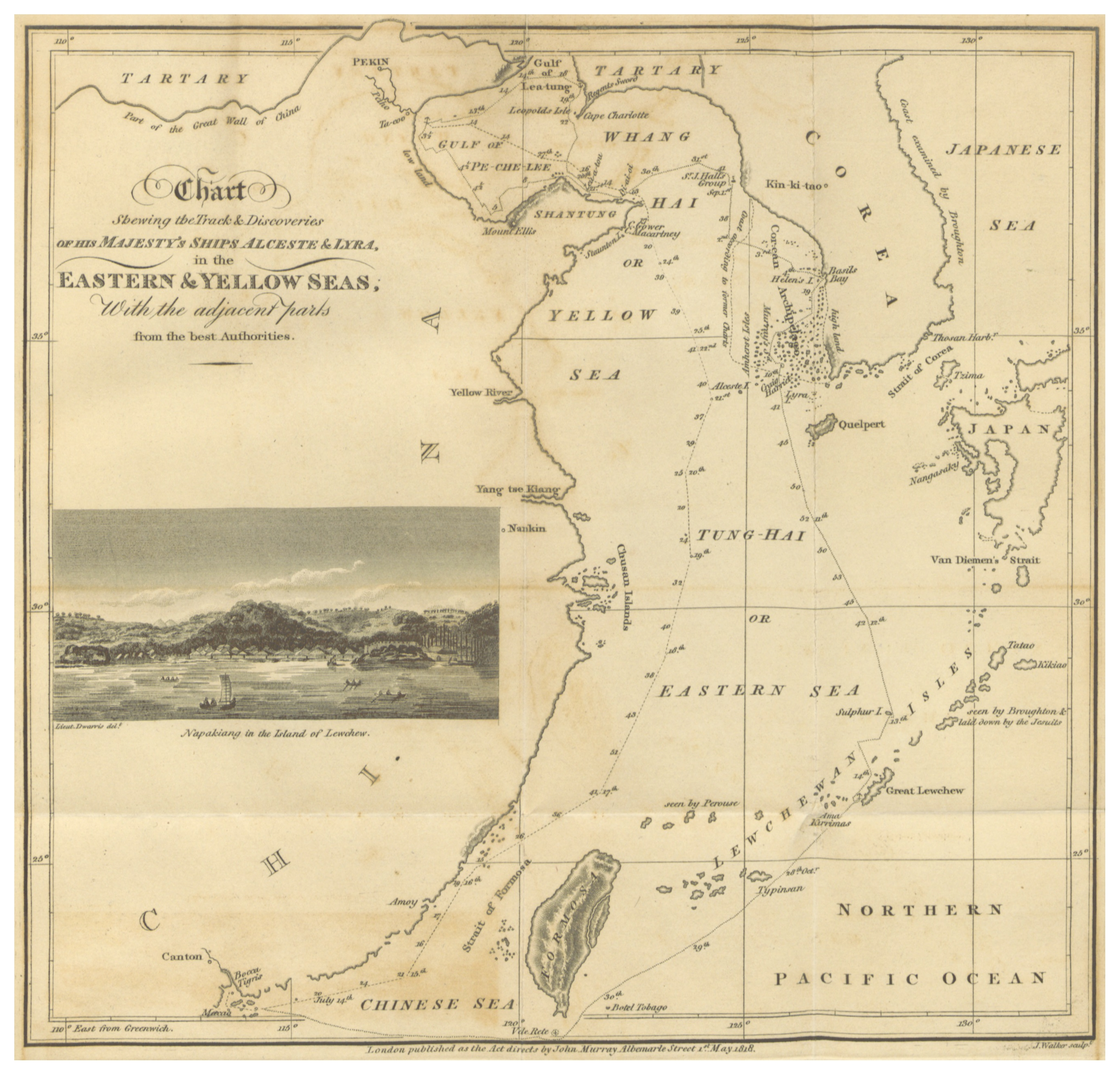
1818 chart showing "The tracks and discoveries of His Majesty's ships Alceste and Lyra in the Southern and Yellow Seas", published in "Narrative of a Voyage, in His Majesty's late ship Alceste, to the Yellow Sea, along the coast of Corea"

After the Treaty of Paris, the British government sought stronger ties with China. William Amherst, the diplomat chosen to inform the emperor of the peace in Europe and to offer Britain's friendship, specifically requested Maxwell and Alceste to accompany him. Maxwell, without a ship since HMS Daedalus was wrecked three years before, commissioned Alceste at the beginning of 1816. The journey out was uneventful; Alceste left Spithead for China on 9 February with Amherst aboard, and after stopping at Madeira, Rio de Janeiro, the Cape of Good Hope, Anyer, and Batavia, sailed through the Bangka Strait into the South China Sea. After calling to pay respects at Canton, Alceste transited the Straits of Formosa and hove-to in the Bohai Sea on 28 July. There she met the 10-gun brig-sloop, HMS Lyra, despatched earlier to herald the arrival of Britain's ambassador.

==== Exploration of Korea and Ryukyu Islands ====
Having arranged to travel back overland from Peking to rendezvous with Alceste at Canton, Amherst was ferried to the mouth of the Hai River on 9 August. As the mission and return journey would take several weeks, Maxwell had an opportunity to explore the area. Alceste headed north, while Lyra, under the command of Lieutenant Basil Hall, was sent south. General Hewett, an East Indiaman chartered to carry gifts for the Emperor of China, was to explore the centre channel. Alceste first undertook a survey of the Gulf of Liaodong, then virtually unknown to Europeans, and after spending some time exploring the Liaodong Peninsula, proceeded southward to Jiaozhou Bay on the coast of Shandong, where she encountered General Hewitt, and was later joined by Hall in Lyra. Alceste and Lyra left the bay on 29 August for the west coast of Korea, an area that had not been surveyed since the Jesuit missionaries visited in the 16th and 17th centuries. Maxwell found the Korean coast to be some 130 miles further east than expected, and in the process of exploration also discovered the archipelago that forms the south-western tip of the Korean peninsula. Alceste was then turned towards the Loo Choo Islands, now known as the Ryukyu archipelago, dropping anchor in the Napakiang roads on the south-west side of Okinawa on 16 September 1816. After a six-week stay, Alceste returned to China via the southern end of the island of Taiwan, arriving at the mouth of the Pearl River on 2 November.

==== Return to Whampoa ====
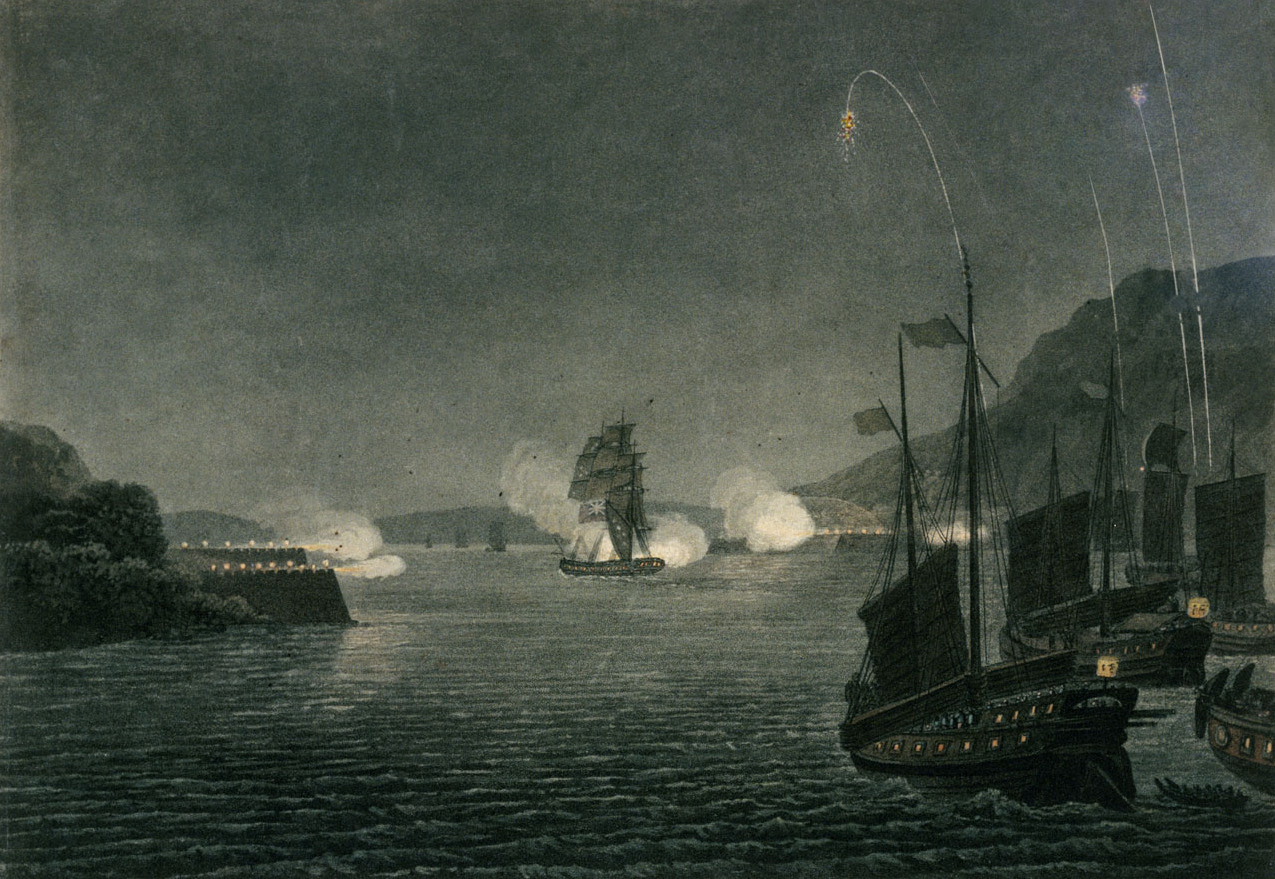
Alceste attacking Chinese defences in the Bocca Tigris. Engraved by Matthew Dubourg and painted by John McLeod in 1816

Alceste required some repairs after a long journey in inclement weather so Maxwell petitioned the viceroy of Canton for permission to travel up the Bocca Tigris to a secure anchorage, unaware that Amherst's mission had been unsuccessful. The emperor's attitude towards the British envoy had been off-hand; he showed little interest in Europe or its affairs, and refused a gift from George III as he considered it insufficient. Having received an insulting message in response to his request, Maxwell decided to enter the river regardless but was soon hailed by a local mandarin who threatened to have the batteries guarding the entrance sink Alceste if she went any further.

Still in need of repairs and requiring navigation to Whampoa to collect Amherst, Maxwell told the mandarin that he would proceed in any event. Alceste quickly dealt with the shore defences and 17 war-junks sent to stop her, and continued up the river to Whampoa. There she anchored and received fresh supplies while awaiting the arrival of Amherst and his suite. The incident would later be publicly described as, "A friendly interchange of salutes". Having completed as much of his mission as possible, Amherst boarded Alceste which left Whampoa on 21 January 1817.

=== Fate ===
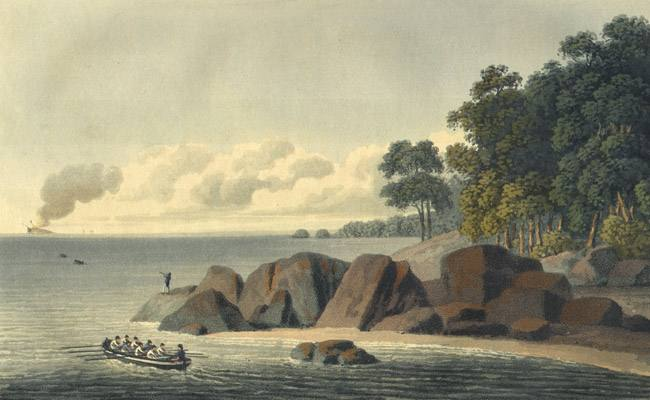
Alceste on the reef, from a drawing by one of her midshipmen, M. F. Brownrigg

With the many uncharted shoals and reefs, and frequent storms, the South China Seas remain some of the most dangerous waters in the world. Despite the continual use of a sounding lead, on 18 February 1817, Alceste grounded on one of the many hidden reefs in the Java Sea. (Note: Alceste was a little undermanned, carrying a complement of 257, including Lord Amherst and his entourage. It would have been usual practice to remove some guns to create more space for distinguished guests. Fewer guns allowed for a smaller crew and this may have been a contributing factor.) Maxwell ordered the anchor dropped to prevent the ship from slipping into deeper water, an undesirable situation if the hull had been breached, which turned out to be the case. The pumps were unable to cope with the influx of water and the ship's carpenter, Cheffy, reported that Alceste was beyond repair.

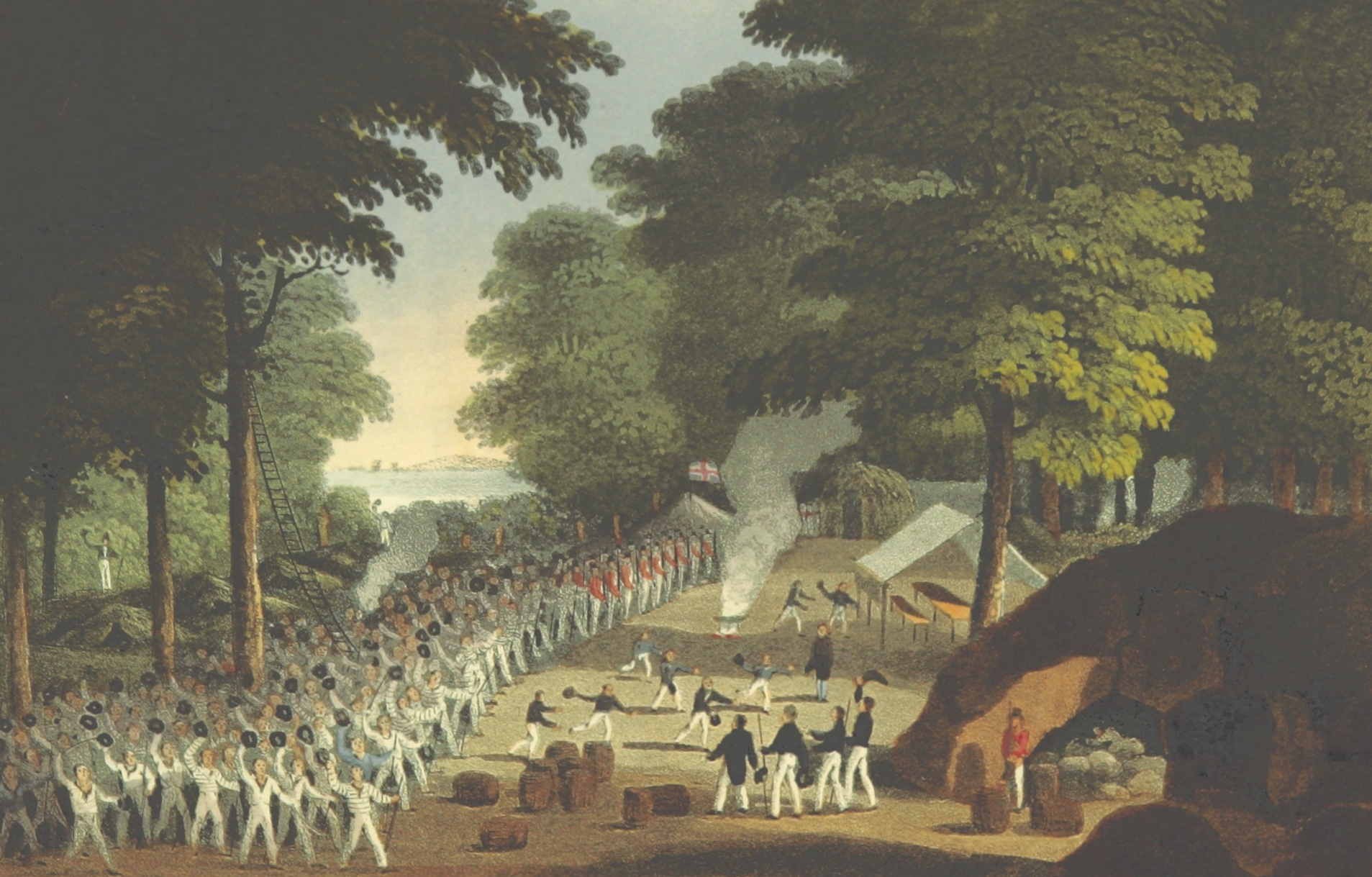
The encampment of Fort Maxwell on Pulo Leat Island, from an 1819 sketch by the ship's surgeon John McLeod

Maxwell ordered his first lieutenant, Henry Parkyns Hoppner, to take Lord Amherst and his party in two of the boats to an island, known today as Pulo Leat, three miles away. The island's thick vegetation prevented an assessment of whether it was inhabited, and forced the boat crews to row a further three miles along the shore before finding a suitable landing spot between the mangroves. The rest of the ship's company were evacuated in the remaining boats and a large raft. Because of the lack of provisions, in particular drinking water, it was decided that Hoppner would continue with Amherst and his embassy to Java, roughly 200 miles to the south. Once there, a rescue could be initiated.

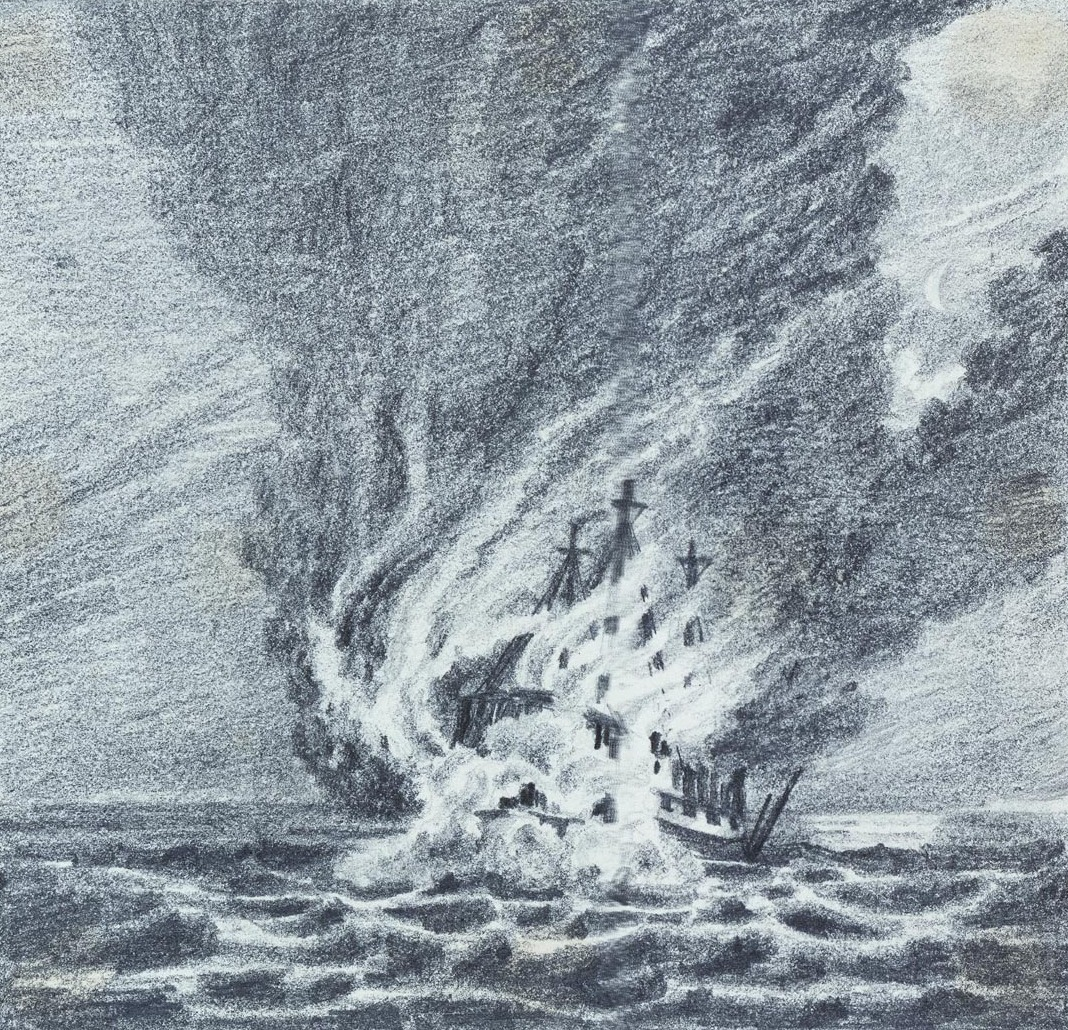
Alceste on fire, sketched by the midshipman C. W. Browne

Hoppner's return journey to Java could not be accomplished in less than nine days, so further supplies would be required for the 200 remaining survivors. An unarmed expedition made its way back to Alceste to see what could be salvaged, but was forced back by the arrival of Dyak pirates who plundered the wreck. Maxwell ordered the construction of a stockade and the improvisation of additional weapons to counter the threat of an attack. The digging of a well solved the problem of water. On 22 February, an armed party set out to reclaim the ship but the pirates set fire to Alceste and made off. The fire lasted throughout the night and destroyed the wreck; the following morning Maxwell sent out a boat that managed to retrieve some barrels of flour, cases of wine, and a cask of ale. The pirates returned at dawn on 26 February, entering the cove aboard two proas and two canoes. Second lieutenant Hay led a sortie that boarded one of the proas, killing four pirates and capturing two more. The proa could not be brought to shore and was scuttled. More pirates arrived over the next two days. They made no attempt to land, but behaved aggressively by firing their swivel guns towards the shore. By 1 March there were fourteen pirate proas in the cove, with more arriving on the following night.

Provisions were now running low, and with the rescue mission overdue, Maxwell began formulating a plan to capture sufficient proas to escape from the island. While the plan was being proposed a sail was spotted on the horizon, heading toward the island. The appearance of this vessel, coupled with a sudden attack spearheaded by Alceste's marines, caused the pirates to flee. The rescue ship was Ternate, a 16-gun brig belonging to the British East India Company's navy, the Bombay Marine, despatched by Lord Amherst on the day of his arrival in Batavia.

Ternate returned to Batavia with the castaways, where Amherst chartered the ship Caesar for the journey to England. During a stop at St Helena, Maxwell met Napoleon, who remembered the action on 29 November 1811 when Alceste had captured La Pomone, and remarked, "... your government must not blame you for the loss of Alceste, for you have taken one of my frigates." The requisite court martial exonerated Maxwell, his officers, and his crew of the loss of Alceste. Maxwell received much praise for his actions, and £1500 from the East India Company. He was knighted in 1818.
