= Archibald Pitcairne =

Scottish physician (1652–1713)

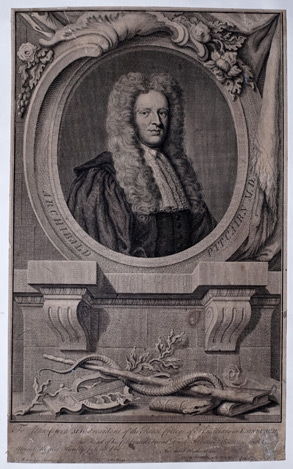
Portrait of Pitcairne by Rob Stranae

Archibald Pitcairne or Pitcairn (25 December 1652 – 20 October 1713) was a Scottish physician. He was a physician and poet who first studied law at Edinburgh and Paris graduating with an M.A. from Edinburgh in 1671. He turned his attention to medicine, and commenced to practise in Edinburgh, around 1681. He was appointed professor of physic at Leyden, in 1692, resigning his chair. On returning to Edinburgh, however, around 1693, he was suspected of being at heart an atheist, chiefly on account of his mockery of the puritanical strictness of the Presbyterian church. He was the reputed author of two satirical works, 'The Assembly, or Scotch Reformation: a Comedy,' 1692, and Habel, a Satirical Poem,' 1692. He wrote also a number of Latin verses. He was one of the most celebrated physicians of his time.

== Early life ==
Pitcairne was born in Edinburgh, Scotland. After obtaining some classical education at the school of Dalkeith, Pitcairne entered Edinburgh University in 1668, and took his degree of MA in 1671. Having been sent to France for the benefit of his health, he was induced at Paris to begin the study of medicine, and after courses at Edinburgh and Paris he obtained in 1680 the degree of MD at Reims University.

== Private practice and academic appointment ==
He began practice at Edinburgh, and was appointed one of three professors of medicine at the Royal College of Physicians of Edinburgh in 1685. In a short time he acquired so great a reputation that in 1692 he was appointed to the Chair of the Practice of Medicine at the University of Leiden. Among his pupils were Richard Mead and George Cheyne and both of them attributed much of their skill to what they had learned from Pitcairne. During Pitcairne's time in Leiden, he is also thought to have taught the great Dutch physician and "father of physiology" Herman Boerhaave.

In 1693 Pitcairne returned to Scotland to marry a daughter of Sir Archibald Stevenson, an eminent physician in Edinburgh. The family objected to her going abroad, so he did not return to Leiden, but settled once more in Edinburgh. He rose to be the first physician in Scotland, and was frequently called into consultation both in England and the Netherlands.

== Anatomical studies ==
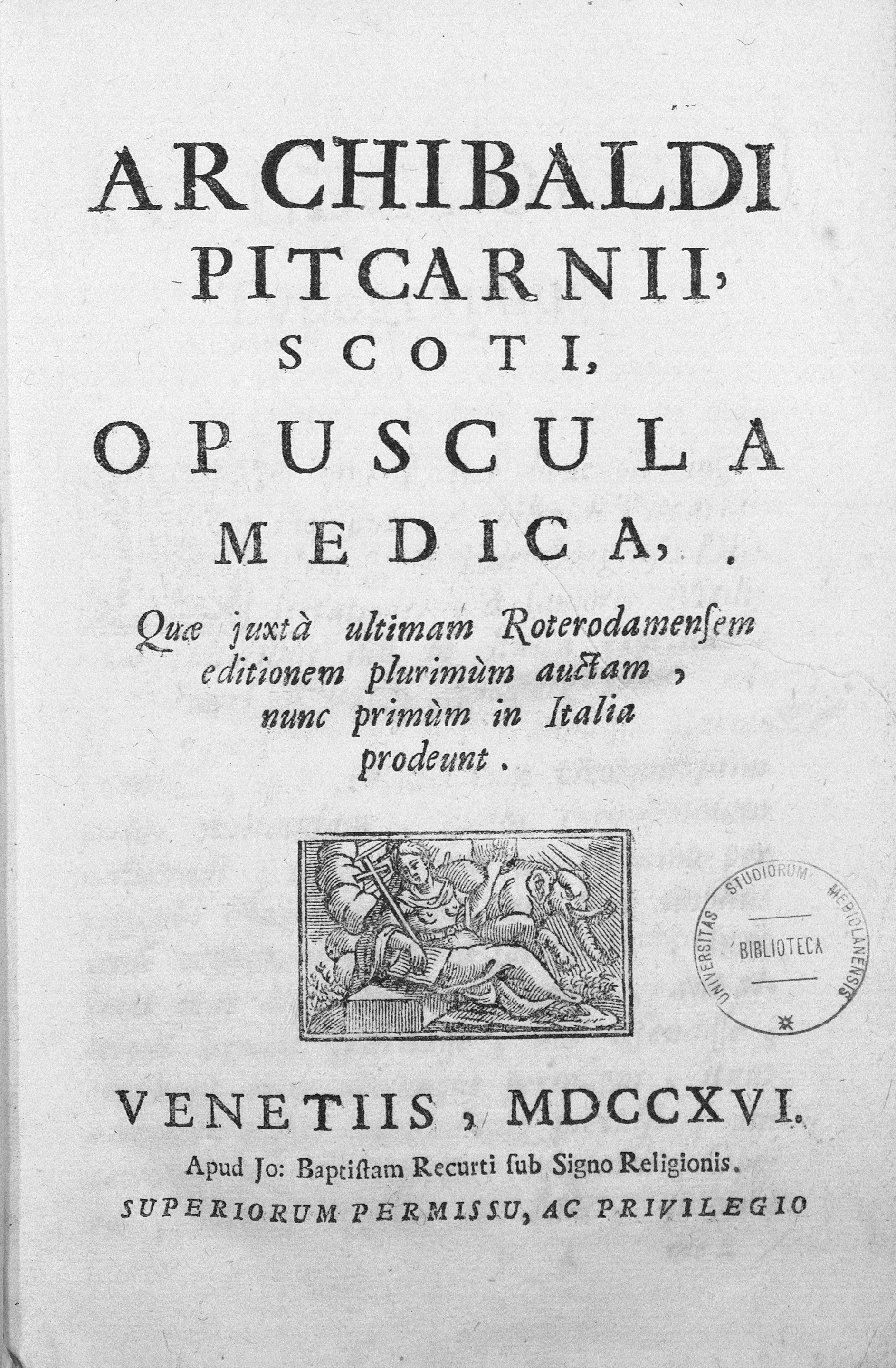
Opuscula medica, 1716

Soon after his return to Edinburgh, Pitcairne made an offer to the town council that would see him and some of his colleagues treat paupers for free at the hospital of Paul's Work at the foot of Calton Hill. In return, he requested that he could dissect the bodies of those that died at the hospital and went unclaimed by their relatives, and who had to be buried at the town's expense. While some of Edinburgh's surgeons strongly opposed the arrangement, the town council eventually accepted Pitcairne's offer, which provided an early boost to the teaching of medicine at the University of Edinburgh.

Pitcairne's medical opinions are chiefly contained in a volume of Dissertationes medicae which he published in 1701 (2nd ed. 1713). Pitcairne was close friends with mathematician David Gregory, with whom he wrote mathematical papers, which in turn informed his hypothesis that Newtonian physics more accurately described bodily functions than the balance of humours. The Dissertationes build on this idea and discuss the circulation of the blood in the smaller vessels, the difference in the quantity of the blood contained in the lungs of animals in the womb and of the same animals after birth, the motions by which food becomes fit to supply the blood, the cure of fevers by evacuating medicines, the effects of acids and alkalis in medicine, and the question as to inventors in medicine (he supported the claim that William Harvey had discovered the circulation of the blood, rather than Hippocrates). His championing of this new 'iatromechanical' theory of physiology played a large part in his professorial appointments in Edinburgh and Leiden. He corresponded occasionally with Isaac Newton himself and visited him on his journey to Leiden in 1692.

== Writings ==
Pitcairne was a good classical scholar, and wrote Latin verses, occasionally with something more than mere imitative cleverness and skill. He was the joint author of a comedy, The Assembly, or Scotch Reformation, originally entitled The Phanaticks (1691), and of a satirical poem Babel, containing witty sketches of prominent Presbyterian divines of the time, whom, as a loudly avowed Jacobite, he strongly disliked.

John MacQueen has suggested that Pitcairne may have collaborated with David Gregorie and Bertram Stott in writing The Assembly. The work circulated as a closet drama and was never performed on stage in Pitcairne's lifetime, its satirisation of Presbyterianism being considered too scurrilous.

== Beliefs and private life ==
He was prone to irreverent and ribald jests, and thus gained the reputation of being an unbeliever and an atheist, though he was a professed deist. The stories about his over-indulgence in drink are probably exaggerated. He was repeatedly involved in violent quarrels with his medical brethren and others, and once or twice got into scrapes with the government on account of his indiscreet political utterances.

Among his friends, however, he was evidently well liked, and he is known to have acted with great kindness and generosity to deserving men who needed his help. Thomas Ruddiman, the Scottish scholar, for example, was rescued from a life of obscurity by his encouragement and assistance. Mead, too, appears never to have forgotten what he owed to his old teacher at Leiden.

When a son of Pitcairne's participated in the Jacobite rising of 1715 and was subsequently condemned to death, he was saved by the earnest interposition of Mead with Sir Robert Walpole. He pleaded, very artfully, that if Walpole's health had been bettered by Mead's skill, or if members of the royal family were preserved by his care, it was owing to the instruction he had received from Dr Pitcairne.

== Death and legacy ==
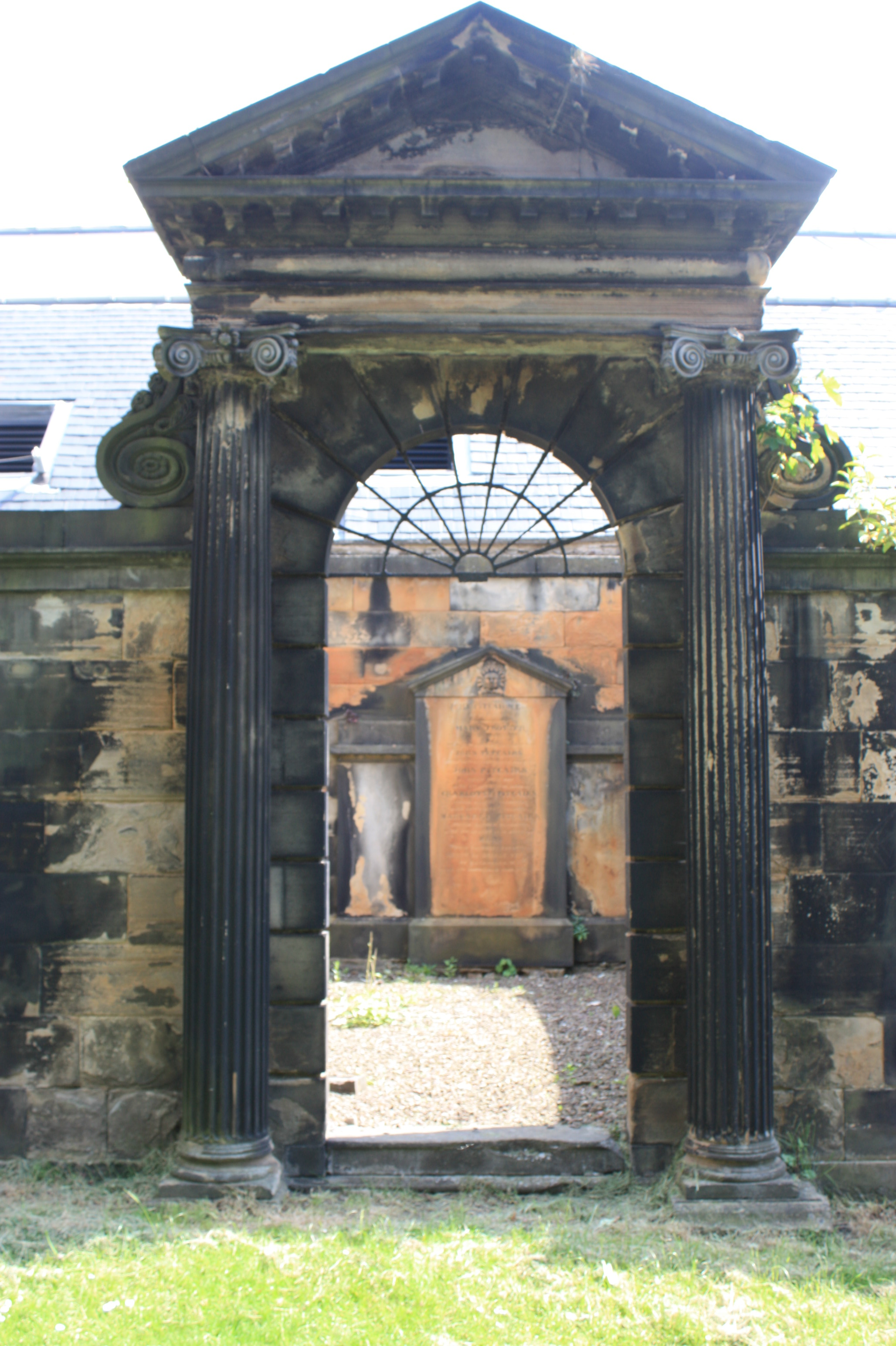
The Pitcairne vault within the Covenanter's Prison, Greyfriars Kirkyard

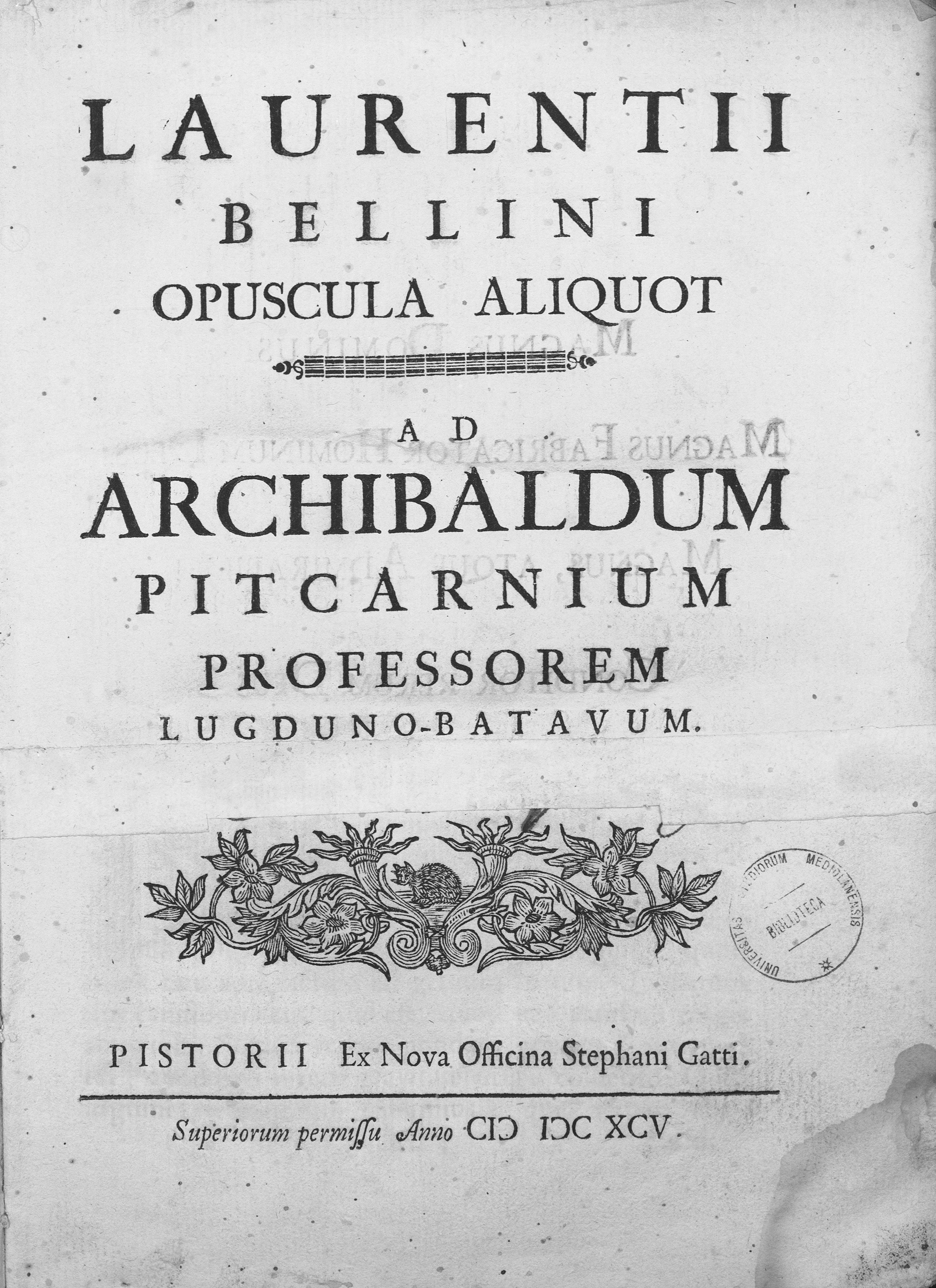
Lorenzo Bellini, Opuscula, 1695, dedicated to Archibald Pitcairne

Pitcairne died in Edinburgh on 20 October 1713, aged 60. He had been a great collector of books, and his library, which is said to have been of considerable value, was, through the influence of Ruddiman, sold to Peter the Great of Russia.

He is buried in Greyfriars Kirkyard with his wife Elizabeth Stevenson (d.1734) and his daughters. The grave lies in the southern section known as the Covenanters Prison and can be viewed by special arrangement or on an organised tour.

A second (more public) faux grave exists in the northmost section of the graveyard, erected by Dr Andrew Duncan.

== Sources ==
- Guerrini, Anita. "Pitcairne, Archibald (1652–1713)". Oxford Dictionary of National Biography (online ed.). Oxford University Press. doi:10.1093/ref:odnb/22320. (Subscription, Wikipedia Library access or UK public library membership required.)
- Henderson, Thomas Finlayson (1896). "Pitcairne, Archibald" . In Lee, Sidney (ed.). Dictionary of National Biography. Vol. 45. London: Smith, Elder & Co.
- Irving, Joseph (1881). The book of Scotsmen eminent for achievements in arms and arts, church and state, law, legislation, and literature, commerce, science, travel, and philanthropy. Paisley: A. Gardner. pp. 410-411.
- Lee, Sidney, ed. (1903). "Pitcairne, Archibald". Index and Epitome. Dictionary of National Biography. Cambridge University Press. pp. 1045–1046.
