= Abeille-class brig =

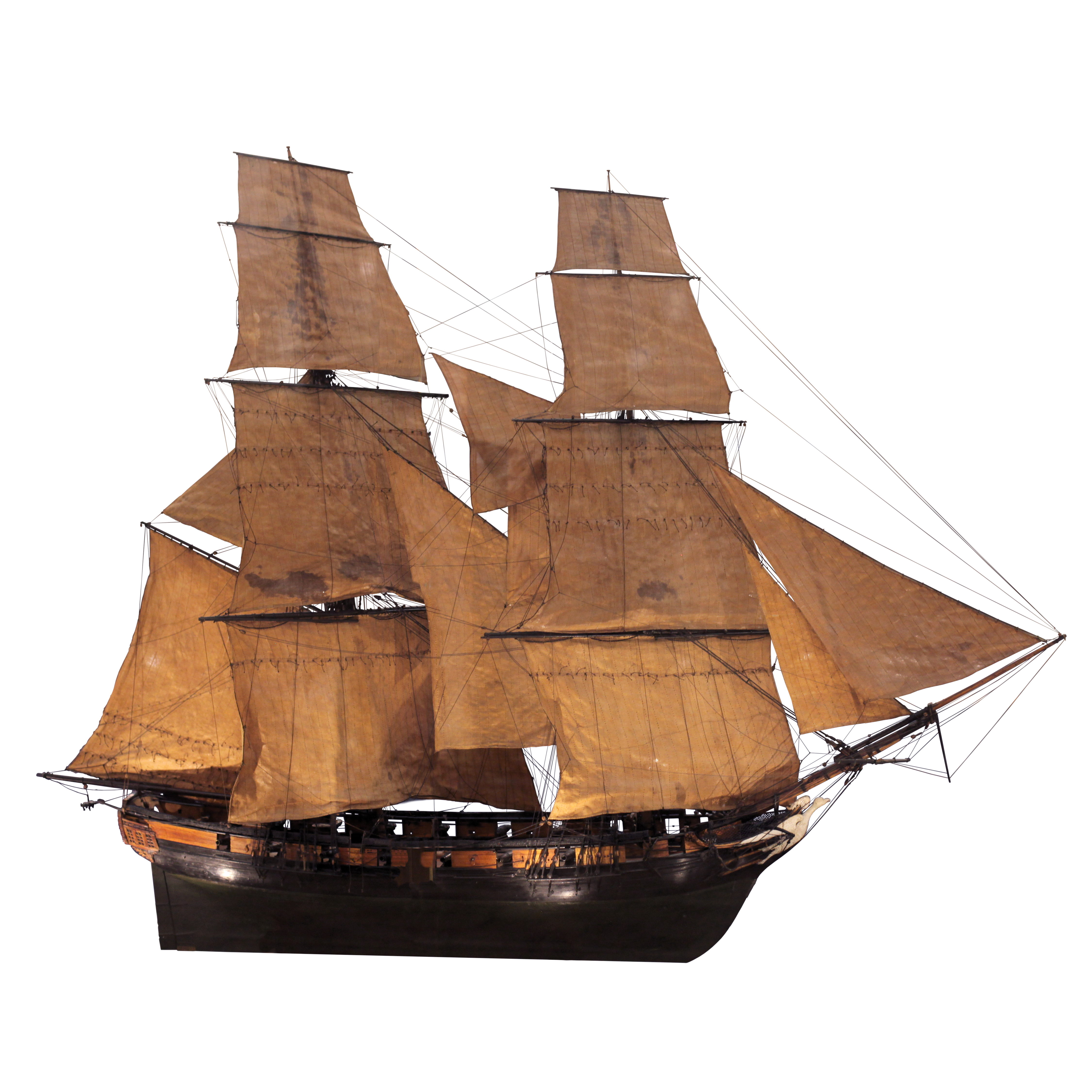
- 1/36 scale model of Cygne, on display at the Musée national de la Marine in Paris

Class overview
- Name: Abeille
- Operators: French Navy; Royal Navy
- In commission: 1800–1847
- Completed: 19
- Canceled: 2

General characteristics
- Displacement: 350 tonnes
- Length: 32 metres
- Beam: 8.7 metres
- Draught: 3.5 metres
- Sail plan: Brig, 750 m^{2} of sail
- Complement: 84 men
- Armament: 16 × 24-pounder carronades; or; 10 6-pounder long guns; 8 × 16-pounder carronades
- Armour: Timber

The Abeille class was a type of 16-gun brig-corvette of the French Navy, designed by François Pestel with some units refined by Pierre-Jacques-Nicolas Rolland. They were armed with either 24-pounder carronades, or a mixture of light 6-pounder long guns and lighter carronades. Twenty-one ships of this type were built between 1801 and 1812, and served in the Napoleonic Wars.

The four first ships were ordered in bulk on 24 December 1800, but two (Mouche and Serin) could not be completed due to shortages of timbers. As the forerunner of the series, Abeille, is not always identified as such in British sources, the type is sometimes referred to as the Sylphe class, after Sylphe, which served as model for subsequent constructions.

== Ships ==
- Mouche

Builder: Toulon
Begun: 24 December 1800
Launched:
Completed:
Fate: Never completed due to lack of timber

- Abeille

Builder: Toulon
Begun: 24 December 1800
Launched: 24 June 1801
Completed: 21 May 1801
Fate: Hulked in 1844, renamed Molène and used as an anchor depot in Brest in 1865

- Furet

Builder: Toulon
Begun: September 1801
Launched: 24 December 1801
Completed: 25 February 1802
Fate: Captured by HMS Hydra on 27 February 1806

- Serin

Builder: Toulon
Begun: 1802
Launched:
Completed:
Fate: Never completed due to lack of timber

- Faune

Builder: Nantes
Begun: 1803
Launched: 8 July 1804
Completed:
Fate: Captured by HMS Goliath on 2 August 1805 and commissioned in the Royal Navy as HMS Fawn

- Néarque

Builder: Caudan, Lorient
Begun: 15 June 1803
Launched: 27 April 1804
Completed: 13 July 1804
Fate: Captured by HMS Niobe on 28 March 1806.

- Sylphe

Builder: Dunkerque
Begun: June 1803
Launched: 10 July 1804
Completed: 29 September 1804
Fate: Captured by HMS Comet on 18 August 1808, commissioned in the Royal Navy as HMS Seagull

- Adonis

Builder: Genoa (Italy)
Begun: April 1805
Launched: 18 August 1806
Completed: 21 November 1806
Fate: Broken up in 1823

- Cygne

Builder: Le Havre Dockyard
Begun: 28 April 1806
Launched: 12 September 1806
Completed:
Fate: Ran aground and scuttled by fire to avoid capture

- Écureuil

Builder:
Begun:
Launched:
Completed:
Fate:

- Requin

Builder:
Begun:
Launched:
Completed:
Fate:

- Béarnais

Builder:
Begun:
Launched:
Completed:
Fate:

- Génie

Builder:
Begun:
Launched:
Completed:
Fate:

- Pluvier

Builder:
Begun:
Launched:
Completed:
Fate:

- Basque

Builder:
Begun:
Launched:
Completed:
Fate:

- Hussard

Builder:
Begun:
Launched:
Completed:
Fate:

- Renard

Builder: Genoa Dockyard
Begun: November 1808
Launched: 12 May 1810
Completed:
Fate: Seized by the British in 1814 with the capitulation of Genoa

- Zèbre

Builder:
Begun:
Launched:
Completed:
Fate:

- Faune

Builder:
Begun:
Launched:
Completed:
Fate:

- Actéon

Builder:
Begun:
Launched:
Completed:
Fate:

- Inconstant

Builder:
Begun:
Launched:
Completed:
Fate:
