= John McLeod (surgeon) =

Scottish naval surgeon and author

- Born: c. 1777/82
- Died: 8 November 1820 (aged 38–43)
- Military career
- Allegiance: United Kingdom
- Branch: Royal Navy
- Service years: 1801–1820
- Rank: Surgeon

John McLeod, MD (c. 1777/82 – 1820) was a Scottish naval surgeon and author.

== Life ==
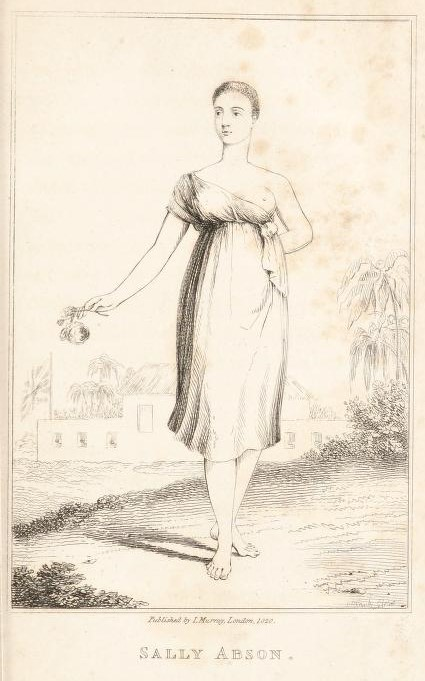
Sally Abson, a mulatta daughter of the Governor of Fort William

John McLeod is said by Joseph Irving to have been born in the parish of Bonhill, Dunbartonshire. The date cannot be verified, because the Bonhill register was destroyed. However, after qualifying as a medical practitioner, and serving some time in the navy as a surgeon's mate, McLeod was promoted to be surgeon on 5 February 1801, the probability is that he was born five or six years earlier than 1782. During 1801 and 1802 he served as surgeon of different small craft in the Channel, and being left by the peace without employment, half-pay, or any chance of a practice on shore, he accepted an appointment as surgeon of the ship Trusty, Davidson, master, bound from London to the coast of West Africa, in the slave trade, which sailed in January 1803. At Whydah, which he describes as being then esteemed "the Circassia of Africa", on account of the comeliness and jetty blackness of its maidens, he was left in charge of a factory for purchasing slaves, while the Trusty went on to Lagos. Shortly afterwards McLeod learnt from a Liverpool privateer that the European war had broken out again. He immediately sent on word to Lagos.

Thereupon, Davidson, assisted by the masters of three or four other British ships at that port, attacked and captured a large French slaver, named the Julie, which had been spoiling their market. The Julie was sent to the West Indies, to be sold for – it was estimated – 30,000l. At Barbados, however, the capture was declared invalid. The ship was condemned as the prize of HMS Serapis, which took possession of her, and when, some little time afterwards, the Trusty arrived, an officer of the vice-admiralty court came off to her, and, putting the broad arrow on her mainmast, arrested the ship and all on board her as pirates. The charge was allowed to drop, and the decision of the Barbados prize-court was subsequently reversed. With that result, McLeod was awarded a part of the prize which he received in 1820. But at the time, disappointed of his share, and disgusted at being stigmatised as a pirate, he took a passage for Jamaica. Here, with his leave being expired, Sir John Buckworth the commander-in-chief, appointed him to the Flying Fish, a small cruiser under the command of an energetic young lieutenant, "and for the next year", he says, "we roamed through each creek and corner of the Caribbean sea, and plundered every enemy of England without the risk of incurring the penalties of piracy".

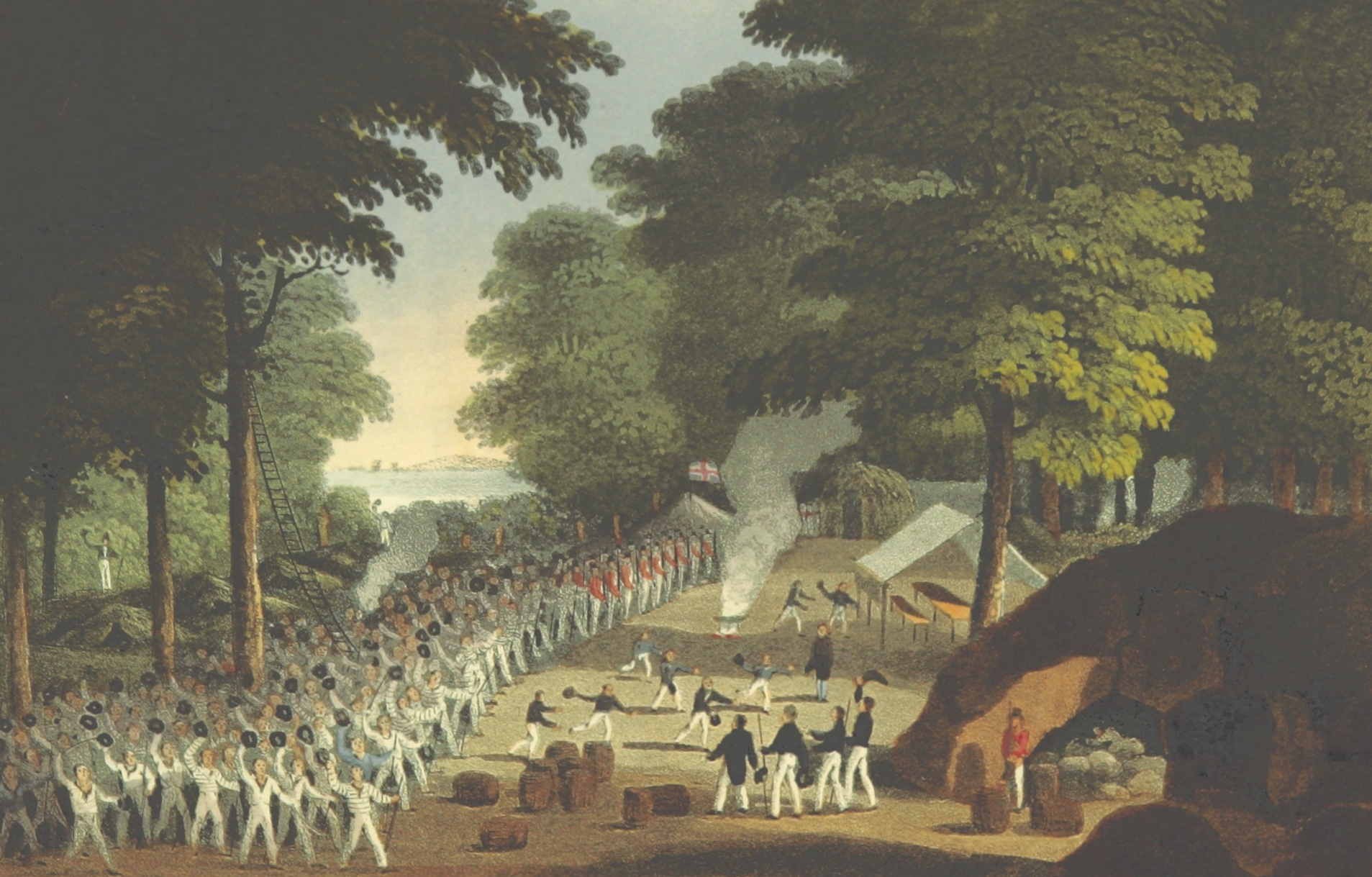
View of Fort Maxwell, the temporary encampment of the shipwrecked crew of the Alceste on Pulo Leat

He was afterwards for two years longer on the Jamaica Station, as surgeon of the Pique frigate, and from 1807 to 1814 was in the Mediterranean, in the Volontaire, with Captain Charles Bullen, in the Tigre with Captain Benjamin Hallowell (afterwards Carew), and in the Warspite with Captain Sir Henry Blackwood. From May to August 1816 he was in the Ville de Paris, the flagship of Lord Keith, in the Channel, and in December 1815 was appointed to the Alceste frigate, then fitting to carry out Lord Amherst as ambassador to China. (Note: see Sir Murray Maxwell) McLeod continued in her during the whole voyage, in her examination of the northern waters, her visit to Loo-Choo and Canton, and when she was wrecked near Pulo Leat on 18 February 1817, returning from Batavia with the other officers and the ship's company in the hired ship Caesar. On the way home he wrote, and published the same year, the Narrative of a Voyage in His Majesty's late Ship Alceste to the Yellow Sea, along the Coast of Corea, and through its numerous hitherto undiscovered Islands, to the Island of Lew-Chew, with an Account of her Shipwreck in the Straits of Gaspar (1817, 8vo). The second edition, with a somewhat different title, was published in 1818, and a third again with an altered title-page, in 1819.

On 4 July 1818, on the recommendation of Sir Gilbert Blane and James Wood, MD, the University of St. Andrews conferred on him the degree of MD. In July 1818 he was appointed surgeon of the Royal Sovereign yacht, and in the following year, encouraged by the success of his literary venture, he put together a short and pleasantly written account of his experiences as a slaver, which was published under the title of A Voyage to Africa, with some Account of the Manners and Customs of the Dahomian People (1820, 12mo). McLeod was still surgeon of the Royal Sovereign at his death, 8 November 1820.

== Bibliography ==
- Irving, Joseph (1881). The Book of Scotsmen Eminent for Achievements in Arms and Arts, Church and State, Law, Legislation, and Literature, Commerce, Science, Travel, and Philanthropy. Paisley: Alexander Gardner. p. 313.
- Laughton, John Knox (1893). "McLeod, John (1777?-1820)" . In Lee, Sidney (ed.). Dictionary of National Biography. Vol. 35. London: Smith, Elder & Co. pp. 213–214.
