= French frigate Amphitrite (1808) =

French Navy ship

Coordinates: 14.600°N 61.062°W

History

France
- Name: Amphitrite
- Namesake: Amphitrite
- Ordered: 6 January 1806
- Laid down: August 1806
- Launched: 11 April 1808
- Commissioned: 1808
- Fate: Scuttled 3 February 1809

General characteristics
- Class & type: Armide-class frigate
- Displacement: 1430 tonneaux
- Tons burthen: 759 port tonneaux
- Length: 47 m (154 ft 2 in)
- Beam: 12 m (39 ft 4 in)
- Draught: 5.5 m (18 ft 1 in)
- Propulsion: Sail
- Complement: 339
- Armament: 24 × 18-pounder long guns; 12 × 12-pounder guns

Amphitrite was a 44-gun Armide-class frigate of the French Navy that saw service during the Napoleonic Wars.

Ordered on 6 January 1806, Amphitrite was laid down at Cherbourg-en-Cotentin, France, in August 1806. She was launched on 11 April 1808 and completed later that year.

Under the command of Frigate captain Jean François Denis de Keredern de Trobriand, Amphitrite departed Cherbourg bound for Martinique on 10 November 1808 as part of a squadron under the overall command of Contre-Amiral Jacques Félix Emmanuel Hamelin that also included the frigates Vénus and Junon, the brig Cygne, and the vessel Papillon The next day, the squadron broke up.

Amphitrite arrived at Fort-de-France, Martinique, only to find it blockaded by the British Royal Navy. She managed to slip through and reach the harbour. On 3 February 1809, as the British attacked Martinique, the French scuttled Amphitrite to prevent her capture.

In 1960, construction work on a modern commercial harbour in Fort de France uncovered the bottom of the hull of Amphitrite. Copper sheets of the hull and other fragments were recovered and are now on display at the Service Régional de l'Archéologie.
