= French corvette Sylphe (1804) =

Abeille-class brig-corvette of the French Navy

Sylphe
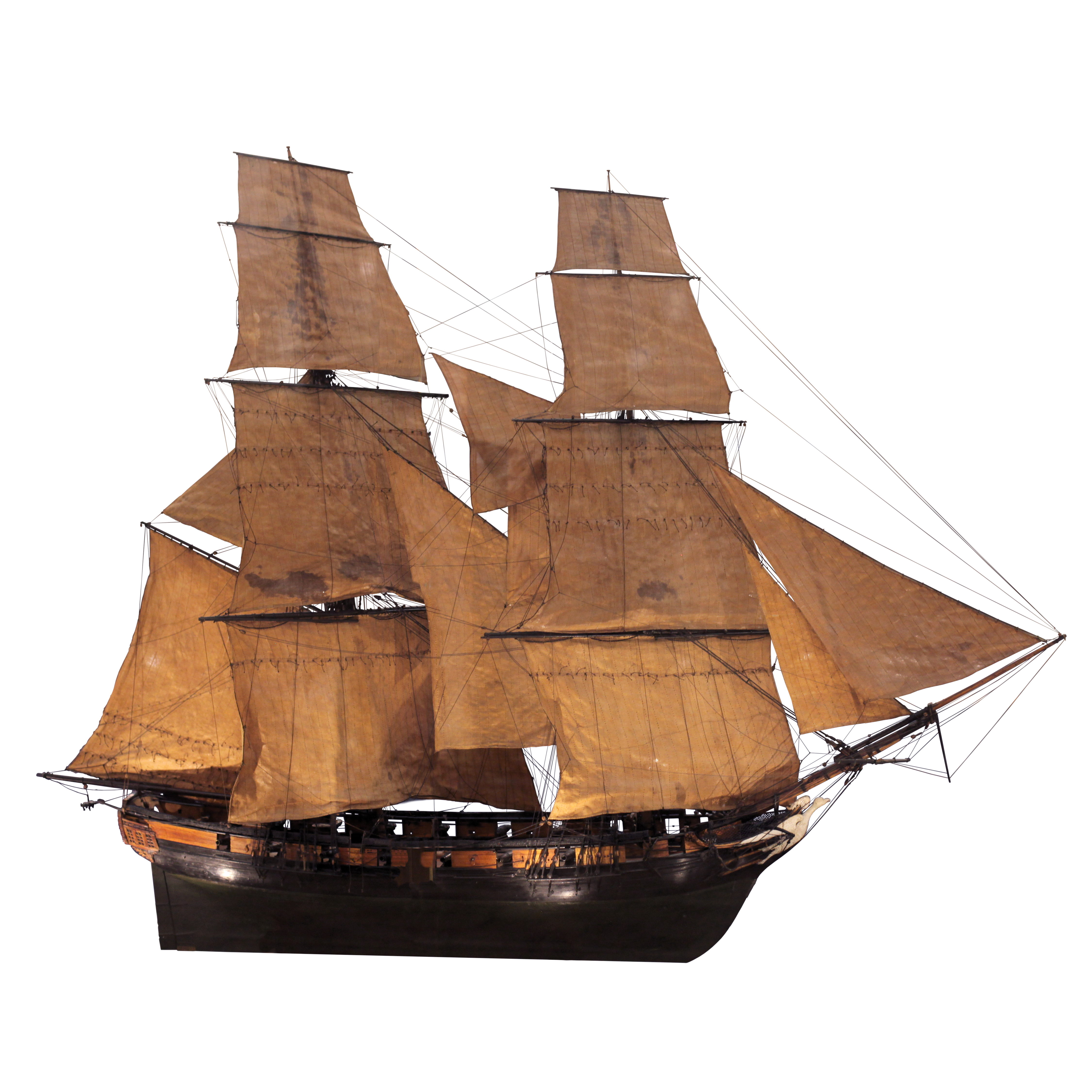
- 1/36 scale model of Cygne, sister-ship of Sylphe, on display at the Musée national de la Marine in Paris

History

France
- Name: Sylphe
- Namesake: Sylph
- Ordered: 7 March 1803
- Builder: Pierre-Joseph Pénétraut, Dunkirk
- Laid down: 10 June 1803
- Launched: 9 July 1804
- Captured: 18 August 1808

United Kingdom
- Name: Seagull
- Acquired: August 1808 by capture
- Fate: Sold July 1814

General characteristics
- Class & type: Abeille-class Brig
- Displacement: 374
- Tons burthen: 342 68/94 (bm)
- Length: 98 ft 5 in (30.0 m) (overall); 79 ft 11 5/8 in (24.4 m) (keel)
- Beam: 28 ft 4 5/8 in (8.7 m)
- Depth of hold: 12 ft 10 in (3.9 m)
- Complement: 98 (French service)
- Armament: Initially:16 × 6-pounder guns; February 1806: 10 × 6-pounder guns + 6 × 16-pounder carronades; From 1807: 16 × 24-pounder carronades + 2 × 9-pounder guns
- Armour: Timber

Sylphe was an Abeille-class 16-gun brig-corvette of the French Navy. The class was built to a design by François Pestel. The British captured her in 1807 and took her into the Royal Navy as HMS Seagull, but apparently never used her in any capacity. She was sold in 1814.

== French service ==
From December 1804 to May 1805, under Lieutenant de vaisseau Jean-Jacques-Jude Langlois, she patrolled between Dunkirk and Hellevoetsluis, and then cruised the coasts of England, Scotland and Ireland. Then she sailed from Pasajes to Rochefort. She then took part in Allemand's expedition of 1805, capturing the merchantman Brothers.

Sylphe captured on 13 May 1805 at 49°49′N 15°25′W a number of vessels in a convey that had left Cork on 9 May for Newfoundland. The British managed to recapture several. Sylphe also captured: Margaret, Chappell, master; Hunter, of Arboath, Stevens, master; and Bowman, of Workington, Priestman, master.

Sylphe took part in the action of 25 September 1806.

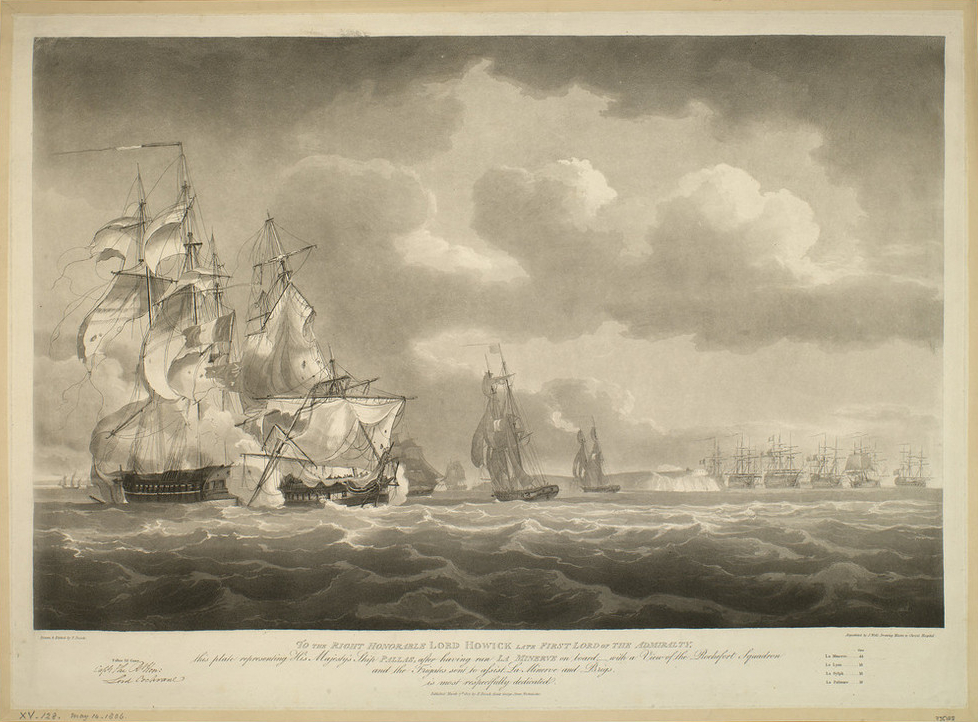
A view of HMS Pallas passing under the batteries of the Île-d'Aix on 14 May 1806. Pallas (second right), after having run La Minerve on board. Sylph, a part of the French Rochefort Squadron, attends.

Between 15 April 1806 and 13 January 1807, Sylphe was in the roads of the Île-d'Aix, still under the command of Langlois for part of the time. (Note: Langlois was promoted to the rank of capitaine de frégate, and put in command of the frigate Armide. During the action of 25 September 1806, HMS Centaur, under the command of Commodore Sir Samuel Hood, captured Armide and Langlois.) On 17 January 1807 Sylphe was in the roads of Lorient under the command of lieutenant de vaisseau Le Maresquier.

On 12 December 1806, the French frigate Thétis and Sylphe captured HMS Netley. The French sold Netley and she became the privateer Duquesne. Less than nine months later, on 23 September 1807, HMS Blonde captured Dusquesne.

== Capture ==
On 9 August 1808 Sylphe, under the command of capitaine de frégate M. Louis Marie Clément, (a Member of the Legion of Honour), sailed with Diligente and Espiègle, to carry supplies from Lorient to Guadeloupe. On 11 August they encountered the 18-gun HMS Comet, under the command of Commander Cuthbert Featherstone Daly. The French, under orders to avoid combat, attempted to escape. Diligente out-sailed her two consorts. Comet caught up with the two laggards, with Espiègle ahead. Comet then engaged Sylphe, capturing her near the Île d'Yeu.

In the 20-minute engagement, the French suffered seven men killed and five wounded, most severely; the British had no casualties. This action earned Daly his promotion to Post-captain, dated 18 August. In 1847 the Admiralty awarded the Naval General Service Medal with clasp "Comet 11 Augt. 1808" to the three surviving claimants from the action. The British took Sylphe into Royal Navy service as HMS Seagull.

== Fate ==
When Sylphe arrived at Plymouth the Admiralty laid her up. She was never commissioned and never fitted for sea duty. The Commissioners and Principal Officers of His Majesty's Navy offered her for sale on 21 July 1814. She was sold on that day for £520.
