= HMS Electra (1808) =

Brig of the Royal Navy

History

France
- Name: Espiègle
- Ordered: 6 June 1803
- Builder: Enterprise Ethéart, Saint-Malo
- Laid down: July 1803
- Launched: 12 July 1804
- Captured: 16 August 1808

United Kingdom
- Name: HMS Electra
- Namesake: Electra
- Acquired: by capture, 16 August 1808
- Commissioned: February 1812
- Decommissioned: 1815
- Fate: Sold, 17 June 1816

General characteristics
- Class & type: Curieux-class brig
- Displacement: 290 tons
- Tons burthen: 314 79/94 (bm)
- Length: 93 ft 3 in (28.42 m) (overall); 74 ft 6 5/8 in (22.723 m) (keel)
- Beam: 28 ft 2 1/8 in (8.588 m)
- Depth of hold: 12 ft 9 in (3.89 m)
- Complement: 94 (French service)
- Armament: 14 × 24-pounder carronades + 2 × 6-pounder guns (British service)

HMS Electra was a 16-gun brig-sloop. She was built by the Enterprise Ethéart, Saint-Malo, as the French Curieux-class brig Espiègle and launched in 1804. She was armed in 1807 at Saint Servan. The British frigate Sybille captured her on 16 August 1808. There was already an Espiegle in the Royal Navy so the Navy took the vessel they had just captured into service as HMS Electra, her predecessor Electra having been wrecked in March. Electra captured one American privateer before she was sold in 1816.

== French service ==
She sailed from Lorient on 15 August 1808 under the command of Lieutenant de vaisseau Maujouan, and in the company of Diligente and Sylphe. The three ships were sailing across the Bay of Biscay en route to Martinique to deliver supplies when they encountered Comet, under Captain Cuthbert Featherstone Daly, on 17 August. Comet soon captured Sylphe but the other two escaped. The next day Captain Clotworthy Upton in Sybille captured Espiègle. Diligente, though, escaped.

== British service ==
Electra was only commissioned in February 1812 under Commander William Gregory and spent most of her brief career escorting convoys to and from Newfoundland. She sailed for Newfoundland both on 27 April 1812 and on 17 March 1813. She did make one capture.

On 7 July 1813 Electra captured a U.S. privateer near Newfoundland after a six-hour chase. She was the schooner Growler, pierced for 14 guns but carrying only one long 24-pounder gun and four 18-pounder guns. She had a crew of 60 men. Growler, under Captain N. Lindsey, had had a relatively successful cruise having taken the ship Arabella, a brig, the schooner Prince of Wales, and the brig Ann. (Note: The prize money for Gregory was £64 5s, and for an ordinary seaman on Electra it was £1 4s 9d.)

Commander Thomas Walbeoff Cecil took command in June 1814, but died of yellow fever in October in the West Indies. (On 28 April 1814, then Lieutenant Cecil of Argo had killed Captain Hassard Stackpole, of Statira, in a duel. (Note: The Naval Chronicle, carried correspondence pertaining to the duel.) Earlier, Cecil had served under Stackpole in Tonnant, and the duel grew out of that experience.) Cecil died of yellow fever at Port Royal on 24 October 1814.

== Fate ==
Cecil's replacement, Commander Richard Lewin, paid Electra off in 1815. On 17 June 1816 the Commissioners of the Navy offered her for sale at Deptford. She was sold there for £800 on 11 July 1816.
