= Korean archipelago =

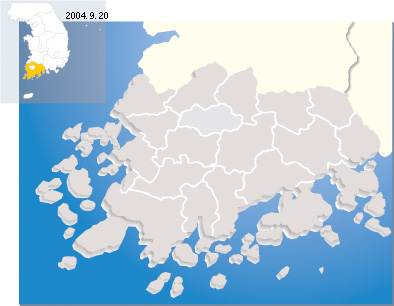
Administrative divisions of South Jeolla Province, with islands depicted

The Korean Archipelago is a group of about 3,500 islands in the South Sea of Korea, just off the coast of southwestern Korean Peninsula. The largest islands are Jindo, Namhaedo and Geojedo, each more than 300 km^{2} (120 sq mi) in area.

== Administration ==
Administratively the group falls in South Jeolla Province and South Gyeongsang Province.

== See also ==
- Dadohaehaesang National Park
