= French ship Nestor (1810) =

Ship of the line of the French Navy

- Scale model of Achille, sister ship of French ship Nestor (1810), on display at the Musée national de la Marine in Paris.

History

France
- Name: Nestor
- Namesake: Nestor, son of Neleus and Chloris and the King of Pylos.
- Builder: Pierre Degay and others, Brest
- Laid down: February 1809
- Launched: 21 May 1810
- Decommissioned: 1849
- Fate: Broken up before 1865

General characteristics
- Class & type: Téméraire-class ship of the line
- Displacement: 3,069 tonneaux
- Tons burthen: 1,537 port tonneaux
- Length: 55.87 m (183 ft 4 in)
- Beam: 14.46 m (47 ft 5 in)
- Draught: 7.15 m (23.5 ft)
- Depth of hold: 7.15 m (23 ft 5 in)
- Sail plan: Full-rigged ship
- Crew: 705
- Armament: 74 guns: Lower gun deck: 28 × 36 pdr guns; Upper gun deck: 30 × 18 pdr guns; Forecastle and Quarterdeck: 16–28 × 8 pdr guns and 36 pdr carronades

Nestor was a 74-gun Téméraire-class ship of the line built for the French Navy during the first decade of the 19th century. Completed in 1810, she played a minor role in the Napoleonic Wars.

== Description ==
Designed by Jacques-Noël Sané, the Téméraire-class ships had a length of 55.87 metres (183 ft 4 in), a beam of 14.46 metres (47 ft 5 in) and a depth of hold of 7.15 metres (23 ft 5 in). The ships displaced 3,069 tonneaux and had a mean draught of 7.15 metres (23 ft 5 in). They had a tonnage of 1,537 port tonneaux. Their crew numbered 705 officers and ratings during wartime. They were fitted with three masts and ship rigged.

The muzzle-loading, smoothbore armament of the Téméraire class consisted of twenty-eight 36-pounder long guns on the lower gun deck and thirty 18-pounder long guns on the upper gun deck. After about 1807, the armament on the quarterdeck and forecastle varied widely between ships with differing numbers of 8-pounder long guns and 36-pounder carronades. The total number of guns varied between sixteen and twenty-eight. The 36-pounder obusiers formerly mounted on the poop deck (dunette) in older ships were removed as obsolete.

== Construction and career ==
Nestor was laid down in February 1809 at the Arsenal de Brest and launched on 21 May 1810. The ship was completed in September and commissioned on 26 September. Nestor was manned, upon direct orders from Napoleon, by crews from the 14th Battalion of the Fleet, taken from the frigates Renommée and Clorinde. On 2 December 1812, she accidentally collided with the corvette Diligente in Toulon harbour. Decommissioned at the Bourbon Restoration in 1814, she was ordered to be razeed to a frigate on 3 March 1822, but the order was rescinded on 22 May. Nestor was refitted in 1823. She was reactivated in 1830 and took part in the Invasion of Algiers.

Plans were drawn up in 1846-1849 to convert her to steam. The order to do so was given on 24 April 1848, and she was to receive a 450 nhp engine. However, a survey determined that Nestor was too rotted. Instead, on 29 August 1849 she was converted to a prison hulk. The engine that had been acquired for her went instead to the 90-gun Charlemagne. Nestor was broken up before 1865.
