= HMS Comet (1807) =

Sloop of the Royal Navy

- Plan of the Comet

History

United Kingdom
- Name: HMS Comet
- Namesake: The comet C/1807 R1
- Ordered: 1 October 1805
- Builder: William Taylor, Bideford, United Kingdom
- Laid down: February 1806
- Launched: 25 April 1807
- Commissioned: January 1808
- Honours and awards: Naval General Service Medal with clasp "Comet 11 Augt. 1808"
- Fate: Sold 12 October 1815

United Kingdom
- Name: Alexander
- Launched: 1807
- Acquired: 1815 by purchase
- Fate: Wrecked 9 August 1828

General characteristics
- Type: Thais-class fireship
- Tons burthen: 427, 446, 447, or 449 (bm)
- Length: Overall:109 ft 0 in (33.2 m); Keel:90 ft 11 3/4 in (27.7 m)
- Beam: 29 ft 5 1/2 in (9.0 m)
- Draught: 18 ft (5.5 m)
- Depth of hold: 9 ft 0 in (2.7 m)
- Sail plan: Full-rigged ship
- Complement: 121
- Armament: Upper deck:18 × 24-pounder carronades; QD:6 × 18-pounder carronades; Fc:2 × 9-pounder guns + 2 × 18-pounder carronades

HMS Comet was launched in 1807 as a Thais-class fireship of the Royal Navy. In 1808 the class were re-rated as sloops, and in 1811 they were re-rated as 20-gun sixth rates. Comet participated in one action that resulted in her crew being awarded the Naval General Service Medal, and some other actions and captures. The Navy sold her in 1815. In 1816 she became an East Indiaman, sailing under a license from the British East India Company (EIC). She sailed between the United Kingdom and Ceylon. It was on one of these journeys that she was wrecked on Cole House Point on the River Thames on 9 August 1828.

== Royal Navy ==
Commander Cuthbert Featherstone Daly commissioned Comet in January 1808 for the Channel.

In June 1808 HMS Cossack and Comet went to St Andero to assist Spanish loyalists and bring off any British subjects. On 21 June boats from Cossack and Comet landed seamen and Royal Marines who spiked the guns of Fort St Salvador de Ano and Fort Sedra, near the town of St Andero, to prevent them falling into French hands. They also blew up two magazines, during which Captain Daly of Comet and Lieutenant Read of the Marines were injured when one of the magazines blew up.

Comet shared with HMS Seine, Cossack, and Unicorn in the capture on 29 June of Pierre Caesar (or Pierre Cézar). The Royal Navy took Pierre Caesar into service as HMS Tigress. (Note: Comet shared by agreement.)

On 9 August the French corvette Sylphe, under the command of capitaine de frégate M. Louis Marie Clément, (a Member of the Legion of Honour), sailed with Diligente and Espiègle, to carry supplies from Lorient to Guadeloupe. On 11 August they encountered Comet. The French, under orders to avoid combat, attempted to escape. Diligente out-sailed her two consorts. Comet caught up with the two laggards, with Espiègle ahead. Comet then engaged Sylphe, capturing her near the Île d'Yeu.

In the 20-minute engagement, the French suffered seven men killed and five wounded, most severely; the British had no casualties. This action earned Daly his promotion to Post-captain, dated 18 August. In 1847 the Admiralty awarded the Naval General Service Medal to the three surviving claimants from the action. The British took Sylphe into Royal Navy service as HMS Seagull. (Note: HMS Sybille captured Espiègle on 16 August, and sent her into Cork. The Royal Navy took Espiègle into service as HMS Electra. Diligente reached Martinique. However, she was still there in February 1809 when the British captured the island. Diligente became HMS St Pierre. Diligente may originally have been St Pierre.)

Captain Richard Henry Muddle replaced Daly in August 1808. He sailed to Newfoundland on 17 April 1809, and again in 1810-1811. She overwintered there in and then in spring 1811 patrolled the Grand Banks. In July she escorted a convoy back to England in July. In 1811 Commander William Shepheard replaced Muddle.

Captain Shepheard returned to England and was promoted to post captain on 1 February 1812.

On 10 February 1812 Comet was reclassed as a sixth rate under the command of Captain George Blamey. He sailed Comet for Newfoundland on 25 May 1812.

On 10 February 1813 Comet captured Hero, of 120 ton (bm) and nine men. Hero was bound to Lisbon, from Wilmington with a cargo of flour and rice.

On 23 April 1813 Comet again sailed for Newfoundland. She was paid off at Sheerness in December 1814 and went into ordinary.

Disposal: The "Principal Officers and Commissioners of His Majesty's Navy" offered "Comet, sloop, of 427 tons", "Lying at Sheerness" for sale on 31 August 1815. The Navy sold Comet on 12 October 1815 for £1,400. She became the mercantile Alexander.

== Merchantman ==
Alexander underwent a through repair in 1816.

Alexander was first listed in Lloyd's Register (LR) in 1816. (There is no volume of LR for 1817 available on line; possibly no such volume was published.)

In 1813 the EIC had lost its monopoly on the trade between India and Britain. British ships were then free to sail to India, the Indian Ocean, and South-East Asia under a license from the EIC. Alexander's owners applied for a licence on 26 January 1816, and received it on 30 January.

Year	Master	Owner	Trade	Source
1816	J.Surflen	Joad	London–Isle de France (Mauritius)	LR; thorough repair 1816
1818	J.Surflen	Joad	London–Isle de France	LR; thorough repair 1816

On 15 April 1818, Alexander, Surflen, master, was returning to London when at 25°53′N 37°30′W she spoke Grand Sachem, Darney, master, which was returning from whaling at Desolation Island.

Year	Master	Owner	Trade	Source
1820	J.Surflen	Joad & Co.	London–India	LR; thorough repair 1816

On 14 November Alexander, Surflen, master, arrived at Mauritius, and on the next day sailed for Ceylon. On 3 January 1820 she arrived at Columbo, Ceylon. She left Ceylon for London on 25 January. In mid-August she arrived back at Liverpool. On 6 December she was at Gravesend, sailing for "Bombay, &c.". On 21 November 1821 Alexander, Surflen, master, arrived Portsmouth from Mauritius and Cape of Good Hope.

On 13 May 1822 Alexander, Surflen, master sailed from London via Portsmouth for Madeira, Mauritius, and Ceylon. She arrived in Mauritius on 17 August and left for Columbo on 3 September. She arrived back at Gravesend on 11 March 1823 from Ceylon. She had left Mauritius on 9 December 1822 and had been at Saint Helena between 9 December 1822 and 18 January 1823.

On his return, Captain Surflen left Alexander to become master of a larger ship, Lady Kennaway, which had been launched in Calcutta in 1816 and sold in London in April 1823.

Year	Master	Owner	Trade	Source
1823	J.Surflen; Richardson	Joad	London–Ceylon	LR; thorough repair 1816 & deck repairs 1823
1828	Richardson	Joad & Co.	London–Ceylon	LR; thorough repair 1816 & bends doubled

== Loss ==
On 6 April 1828 Alexander sailed from Colombo, Ceylon, calling at Mauritius on 2 May, and arriving in London on 6 August. The following day, she was driven ashore and was wrecked at Cole House Point near Gravesend on the River Thames. The cargo was lost.
