= French brig Cygne (1806) =

French ship

Cygne
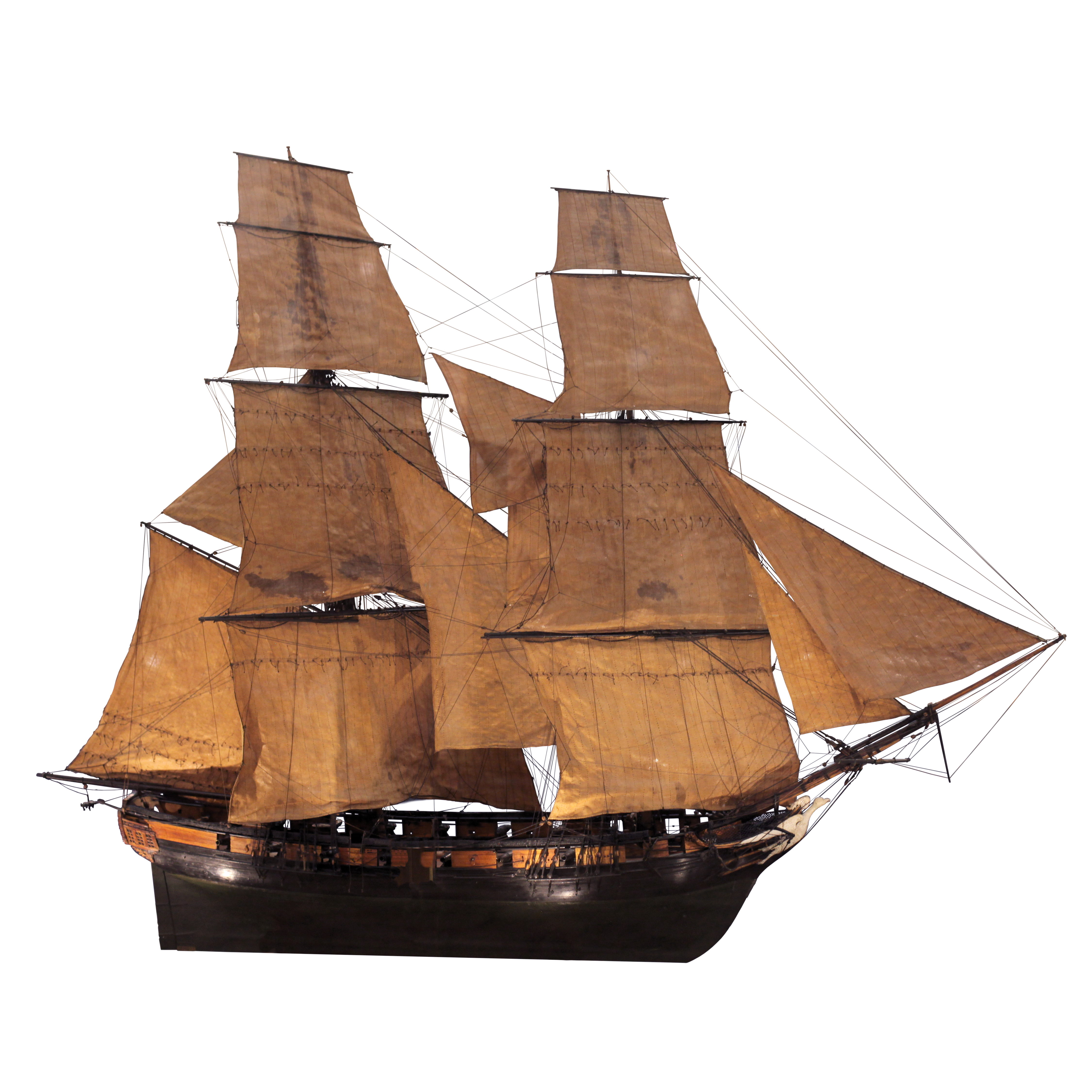
- 1/36 scale model of Cygne, on display at the Musée national de la Marine in Paris

History

France
- Name: Cygne
- Namesake: Swan
- Ordered: 21 January 1806
- Builder: Le Havre Dockyard
- Laid down: 28 April 1806
- Launched: 12 September 1806
- Fate: Wrecked on 13 December 1808

General characteristics
- Class & type: Abeille-class brig
- Displacement: 350 ton (French)
- Length: 32 m (105 ft 0 in)
- Beam: 8.7 m (28 ft 7 in)
- Draught: 3.5 m (11 ft 6 in)
- Complement: 84
- Armament: 14 × 24-pounder carronades; 2 × 6-pounder chase guns
- Armour: Timber

Cygne was an Abeille-class 16-gun brig of the French Navy, launched in 1806.

== Career ==
On 10 November 1808, under Lieutenant Menouvrier Defresne, Cygne departed Cherbourg, part of a squadron under Rear-Admiral Hamelin also comprising the frigates Vénus, Junon, Amphitrite and the brig Papillon. bound for Martinique. The next day, the ships of the squadron were scattered. On 13, Cygne captured the Portuguese ship Miliciano and set her ablaze.

Arriving near Martinique, Cygne was chased by the frigate HMS Circe (Augustin Collier), the corvette Stork (George Le Geyt), the brigs Morne Fortunee (John Brown), Amaranthe (Pelham Brenton), Epervier (Thomas Tudor) and the schooner Express (William Dowers). On 12 December, Cygne passed the northern cape of Martinique; seeing that he would be overhauled by the British squadron before reaching Saint-Pierre, Menouvrier Defresne decided to drop anchor under a shore battery at Anse Céron.

Two of the British brigs then dropped anchor in positions that cut Cygne's retreat to Saint-Pierre, while the other ships launched boats to attempt a cutting out boarding. (Note: Troude notes that Defresne reported seven boats each carrying about 50 men, while James states that only 68 men were involved.) Cygne sank three before they reached her. Circe approached with her crew ready for boarding, but was repelled by a grapeshot broadside, while the surviving boats reached Cygne's stern; the party was repelled and 17 men were taken prisoner.

The next day, Cygne found herself becalmed; Defresne attempted to move his ship by having her hauled from the shore by infantrymen and by using her oars, and progressed towards Saint-Pierre, under fire from Amaranthe. However, due to a navigation error, Cygne ran aground and started taking water. As the other British ships closed within range, Defresne ordered Cygne abandoned and scuttled by fire. Defresne was offered a sword of honour by the city of Saint-Pierre for his defence. As a token of esteem, Brenton gifted him a sword belt, and Lieutenant Hay, a dagger.

The wreck was discovered in 1991 and was explored the next year. A 1/36 scale model of the ship is on display at the Musée national de la Marine in Paris.

Depictions of the battle between Cygne and British boats
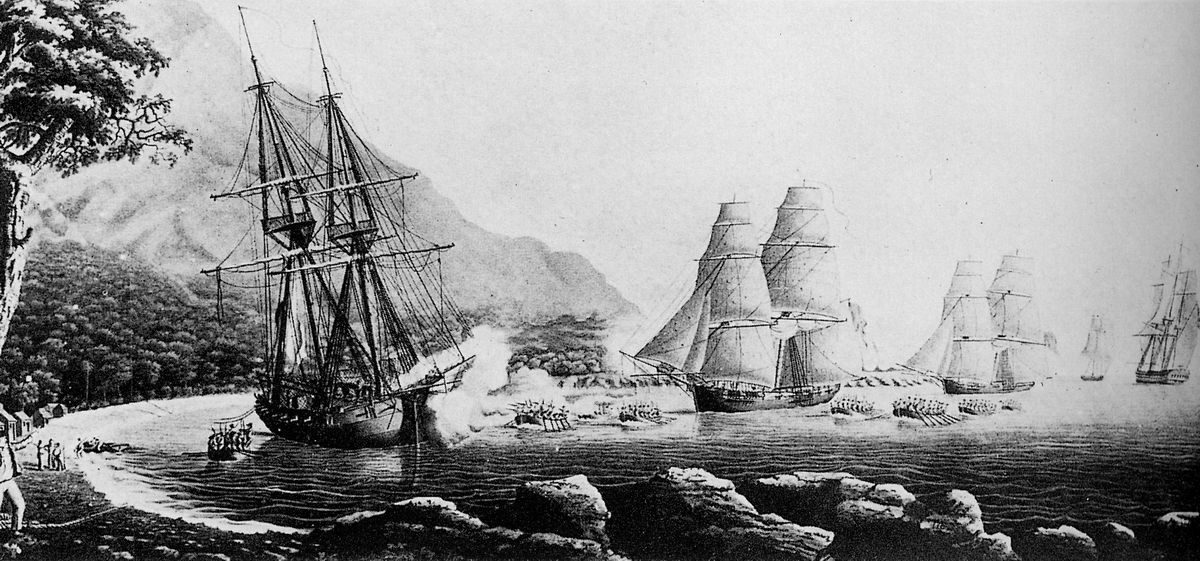
Battle of Cygne against the British division

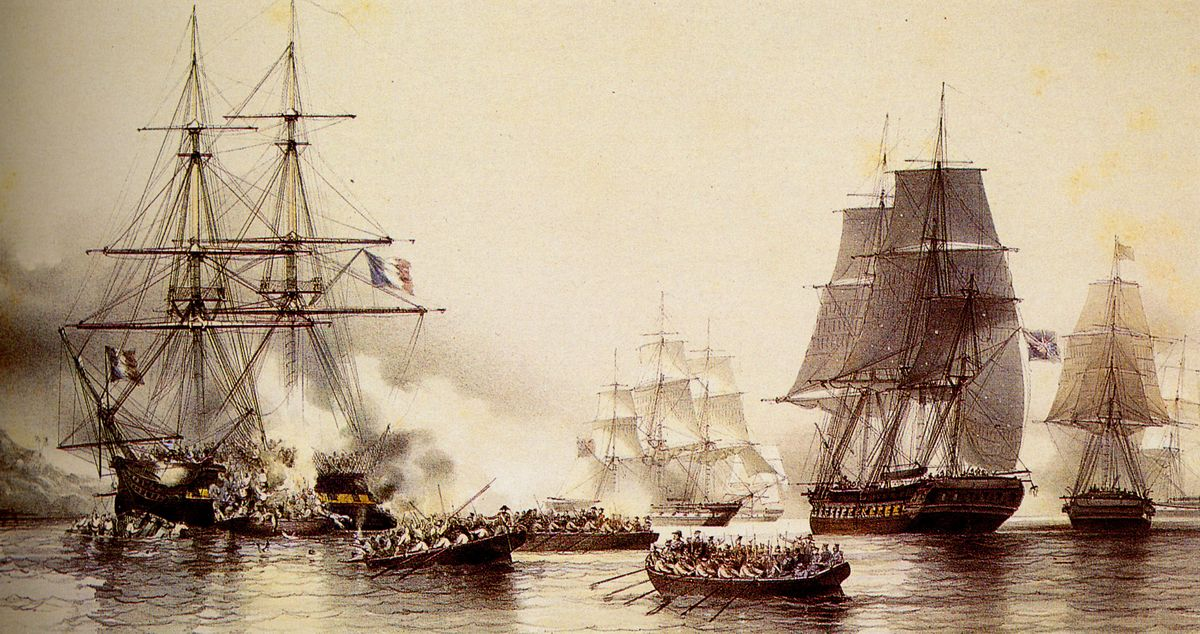
Depiction by Mayer.
