= Joseph Irving =

Scottish journalist, historian and annalist

Joseph Irving FSA Scot (1830–1891) was a Scottish journalist, historian and annalist.

== Life ==
Born at Dumfries on 2 May 1830, he was son of Andrew Irving, a joiner. After being educated at the parish school of Troqueer, over the River Nith from Dumfries, he served an apprenticeship as a printer in the office of the Dumfries Standard.

Irving then worked practised as compositor and journalist in Dumfries and Sunderland. He was for a time on the staff of the Morning Chronicle in London, and in 1854 became editor of the Dumbarton Herald. For some years afterwards he was a bookseller in Dumbarton, and started in 1867 the Dumbarton Journal, which was unsuccessful.

In 1860 Irving became a fellow of the Society of Antiquaries of Scotland, and in 1864 an honorary member of the Archæological Society of Glasgow. He disposed of his Dumbarton business in 1869 on the death of his wife, who had been involved with him in his enterprises. After living a few years in Renton, Dumbartonshire, he settled in Paisley in 1880, where he wrote for the Glasgow Herald and other journals.

After some years of uncertain health, Irving died at Paisley, on 2 September 1891.

== Works ==
Irving wrote:

- The Conflict at Glenfruin: its Causes and Consequences, being a Chapter of Dumbartonshire History, 1856.
- History of Dumbartonshire from the Earliest Period to the Present Time, 1857; 2nd edit. 1859.
- The Drowned Women of Wigtown: a Romance of the Covenant, 1862.
- The Annals of our Time from the Accession of Queen Victoria to the Opening of the present Parliament, 1869 (new edit. 1871), with two supplements from February 1871 to 19 March 1874, and from 20 March 1874 to the occupation of Cyprus, published respectively in 1875 and 1879; a further continuation brought the record from 1879 down to the jubilee of 1887 (Lond. 1889). J. Hamilton Fyfe undertook a later supplement. The Annals became a standard work of reference.
- The Book of Dumbartonshire: a History of the County, Burghs, Parishes, and Lands, Memoirs of Families, and Notices of Industries, 3 vols., 1879.
- The Book of Eminent Scotsmen, 1882.
- The West of Scotland in History, 1885.

He also published: Memoir of the Smolletts of Bonhill; Memoir of the Dennistouns of Dennistoun, 1859; and Dumbarton Burgh Records, 1627–1746, 1860; and a substantive paper on the "Origin and Progress of Burghs in Scotland", in the Transactions of the Archæological Society of Glasgow.

== Notes ==
Attribution

This article incorporates text from a publication now in the public domain: Lee, Sidney, ed. (1892). "Irving, Joseph". Dictionary of National Biography. Vol. 29. London: Smith, Elder & Co.
