= John Talbot (Royal Navy officer) =

Royal Navy Admiral (c. 1769–1851)

Admiral The Honourable Sir John Talbot GCB
- Born: c.1769 Malahide, Dublin
- Died: 7 July 1851 (aged 81–82); Lyme Regis, Dorset
- Military career
- Allegiance: United Kingdom
- Branch: Royal Navy
- Service years: 1784–1815
- Rank: Admiral
- Commands: HMS Helena; HMS Eurydice; HMS Glenmore; HMS Leander; HMS Centaur; HMS Thunderer; HMS Victorious
- Conflicts: French Revolutionary Wars; Capture of Gloire; Napoleonic Wars; Capture of Ville de Milan; Dardanelles operation; Capture of Rivoli; War of 1812
- Awards: Knight Grand Cross of the Order of the Bath

Admiral Sir John Talbot GCB (c. 1769 – 7 July 1851) was a Royal Navy officer who served in the French Revolutionary and Napoleonic Wars in which he fought at several prominent single-ship actions, all of which were successful. Later, during the War of 1812, Talbot was engaged in blockading the Connecticut coast and following the war retired to his country seat, never returning to service.

Talbot's most famous actions were the capture of the French frigate Ville de Milan in 1805 while commander of HMS Leander and the capture of the ship of the line Rivoli in the Adriatic Sea on her maiden voyage, during Battle of Pirano. During the latter engagement Talbot was badly wounded and was subsequently presented with a gold medal for his success.

== Early life ==
Talbot was born in approximately 1769, the son of Richard and Margaret Talbot, of Malahide near Dublin. His mother became Baroness Talbot de Malahide in 1831, the title passing to his elder brothers Richard and subsequently James. A younger brother was Thomas Talbot, a Canadian politician of the early nineteenth century.

Talbot entered the Navy in 1784, joining Horatio Nelson's ship HMS Boreas in the West Indies. In the following years he moved to HMS Barfleur and HMS Victory at Portsmouth and he was promoted lieutenant in 1790 while aboard HMS Triton. At the outbreak of the French Revolutionary Wars in 1793, Talbot was attached to HMS Windsor Castle under Samuel Hood in the Mediterranean. In the next two years, he moved between HMS Alcide and HMS Astraea and aboard the latter he was involved in the capture of the frigate Gloire in April 1796. Talbot sailed the captured Gloire to Britain, where he was promoted to commander and took over the sloop HMS Helena.

== Post-captain ==
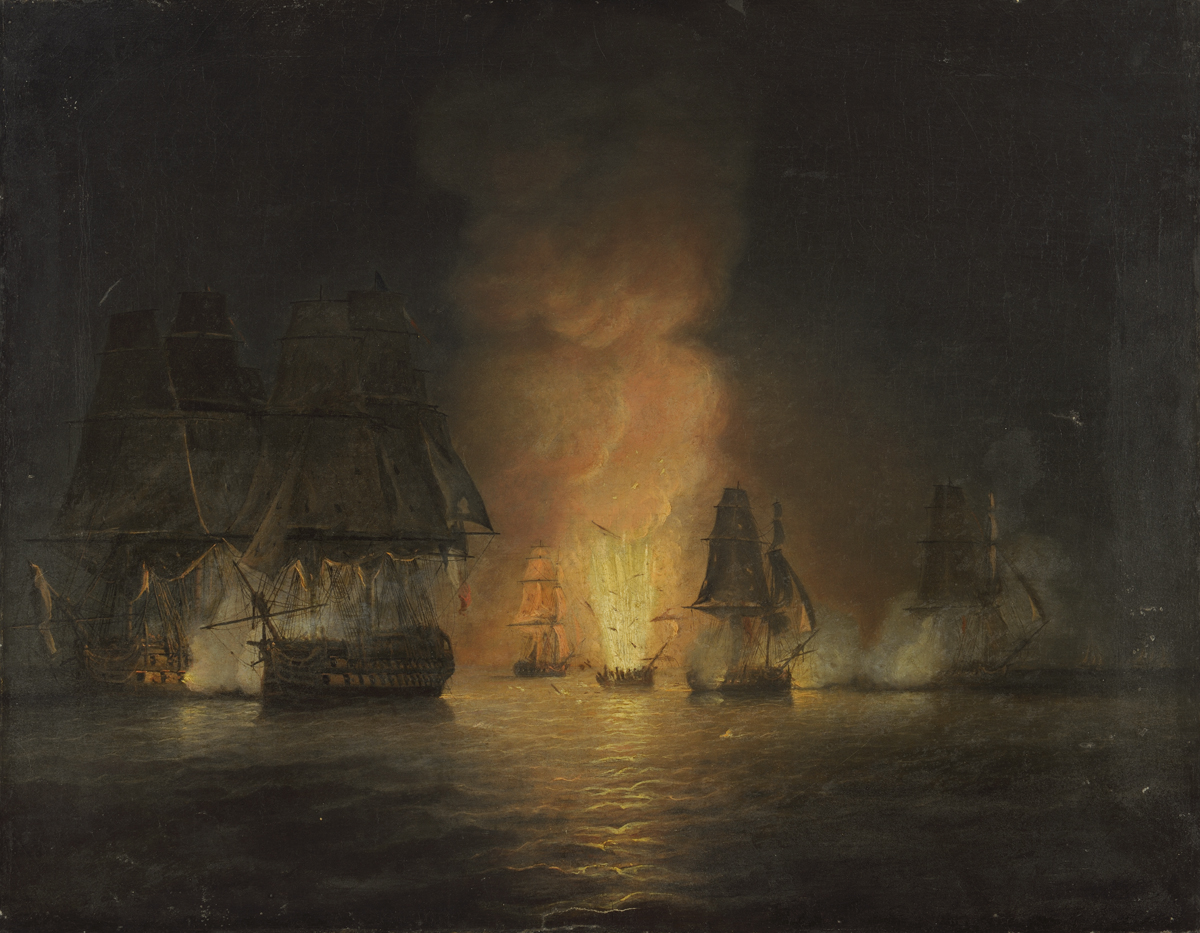
The Battle of Pirano, which Talbot fought in

In August Talbot was promoted to post captain in the sixth rate HMS Eurydice in which he remained for four years in the West Indies and English Channel. During this period he captured numerous enemy merchant ships. Eurydice was present at the Saint Marcou Islands for the Battle of the Îles Saint-Marcouf in 1798, although the lack of wind prevented her from engaging the French attackers.

On 10 November 1799 near Beachy Head she surprised a schooner L'Hirondelle from Calais (14 guns) Captain Pierre Merie Dugerdin attacking a British brig the Diana of Sunderland which was putting up fierce resistance. Eurydice went in pursuit of the Frenchman and along the way met up with HMS Snake, Captain Lewis after a short engagement the Snake succeeded in capturing the schooner.

In 1801 Talbot transferred to HMS Glenmore in Ireland.

At the resumption of the conflict following the Peace of Amiens in 1804, Talbot took over HMS Leander on the Halifax Station. In February 1805 Leander discovered the French frigate Ville de Milan and the British HMS Cleopatra, which the French ship had captured the day before. Both ships were badly damaged and as a result Leander was able to outrun them and capture them without a fight. For this success, Talbot was moved to the ship of the line HMS Centaur and then HMS Thunderer in which he participated in the Dardanelles Operation under John Thomas Duckworth.

In 1809, Talbot took command of HMS Victorious, in which he remained for the rest of his career. In February 1812, Victorious was dispatched to the Adriatic Sea, to intercept the French ship of the line Rivoli recently constructed at Venice. Talbot discovered the French ship with a small escort on her maiden voyage on 22 February and immediately engaged. The ensuing five-hour duel caused heavy casualties on both ships, including Talbot who was badly wounded in the head by a large splinter. When Rivoli surrendered, she was found to have 400 of her crew, approximately half, killed or wounded. Both battered ships were returned to Britain, where they were repaired and Rivoli rejoined the Royal Navy.

=== War of 1812 ===
Talbot, recovered from his wound, was presented with a gold medal and in November 1812 took the repaired Victorious to the West Indies and then to the Eastern Seaboard of the United States during the opening months of the War of 1812. For the next two years Talbot cruised off New London, Connecticut, blockading the port and preventing its use by American shipping. In the summer of 1814, Victorious was sent north to defend the whalers of the Davis Strait in the Arctic from American privateers. During this service, Victorious was badly holed by a rock and was forced to return to Britain. With the end of the Napoleonic Wars, Victorious was paid off.

== Retirement ==
Talbot never again took an active post in the Navy either at sea or on shore. In 1812 he inherited the "Delvins" slave plantation in Montserrat and the 112 slaves on it from his great-uncle John Nugent, who served as governor of the Leeward Islands from 1788 to 1790. He retired to his estate at Rhode Hill near Lyme Regis in Dorset and married Maria Julia Everard, daughter of James Everard Arundell, 9th Baron Arundell of Wardour, with whom he had two sons and five daughters. In 1815 he was made a Knight Commander of the Order of the Bath and in 1819 was promoted to rear-admiral. In 1836, he received £1,599 from the British government as compensation under the terms of the Slave Compensation Act 1837 for the 100 slaves at Delvins who had been freed by the Slavery Abolition Act 1833. For the next thirty years, Talbot lived as a country gentleman, steadily advancing in rank until at his death in 1851 he was a full admiral and a Knight Grand Cross of the Order of the Bath.

== See also ==
- O'Byrne, William Richard (1849). "Talbot, John" . A Naval Biographical Dictionary . John Murray – via Wikisource.
