= French brig Mercure (1806) =

Coordinates: 45.5617°N 13.2053°E

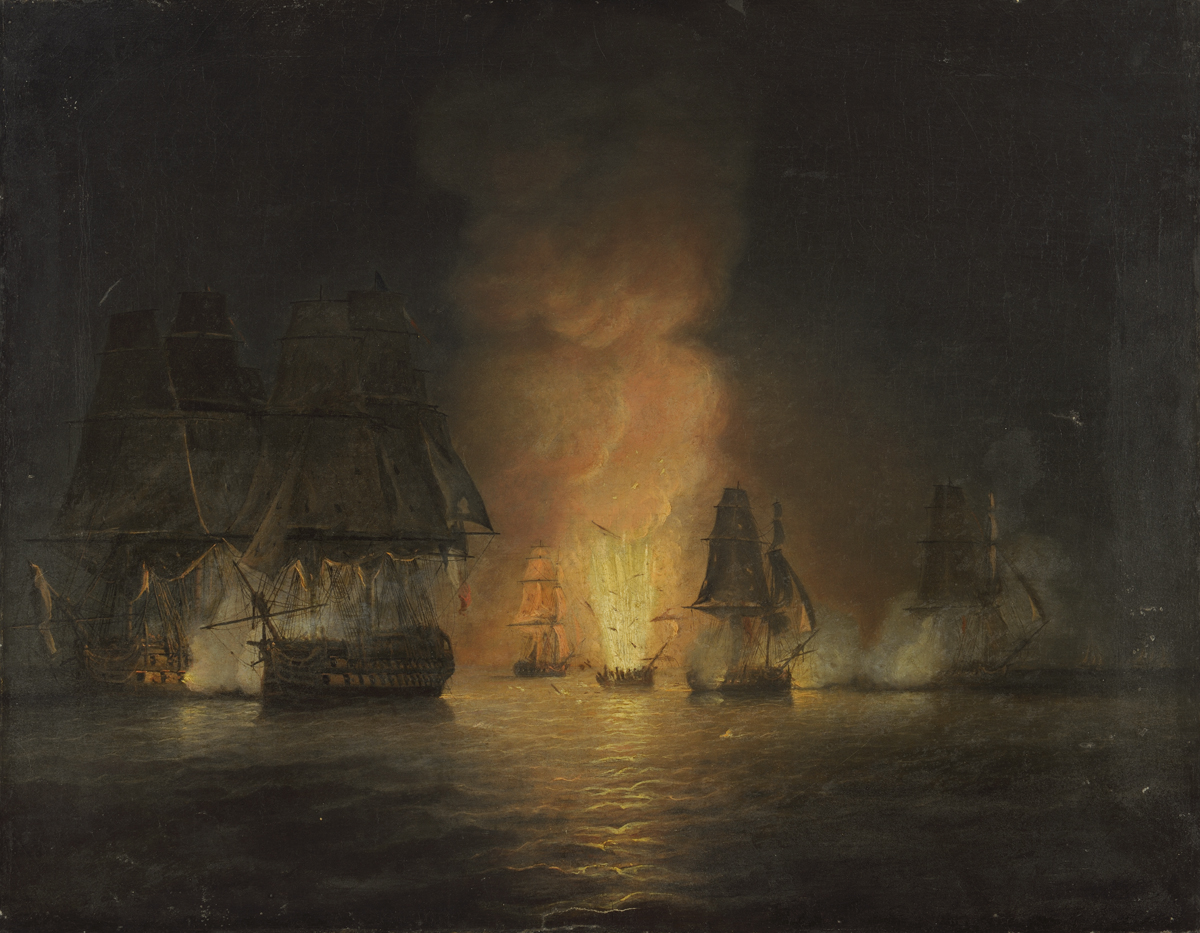
- HMS 'Victorious' Taking the 'Rivoli', 22 February 1812, Thomas Luny. The painting show the explosion of Mercure in the background.

History

France
- Name: Mercure
- Namesake: Mercury
- Builder: Genoa, by Muzio & Migone
- Laid down: May 1805
- Launched: 17 July 1806
- Commissioned: November 1806
- Stricken: 14 June 1810

Kingdom of Italy
- Name: Mercurio
- Acquired: 14 June 1810
- Fate: Destroyed on 22 February 1812 during the Battle of Pirano

General characteristics
- Armament: 16 × 24-pounder carronades
- Armour: Timber

Mercure was a 16-gun brig of the French Navy.

In November 1806, she was commissioned in Genoa under Gen. Lacombe-Saint-Michel. In 1808, she was at Corfu, and in 1810 in Venice. On 14 June 1810, she was transferred to the navy of the Kingdom of Italy, along with Cyclope and Écureuil, in exchange for the frigate Favorite.

On 22 February 1812, as she escorted the newly commissioned 74-gun Rivoli with the brigs Mamelouk and Iéna, the squadron encountered a British force. In the ensuing Battle of Pirano, Mercure battled against HMS Weazel for 45 minutes until her magazines suddenly exploded, instantly sinking her and killing all aboard except for three men, who were rescued by Weazel.

The wreck of Mercure was discovered in 2001 when a fishing net caught one of her guns. Archeological campaigns were conducted from 2002, and the hull was found in 2005, in good condition.
