= Sir Graham Hamond, 2nd Baronet =

Royal Navy officer (1779-1862)

Admiral of the Fleet Sir Graham Hamond Bt GCB DL KCTS
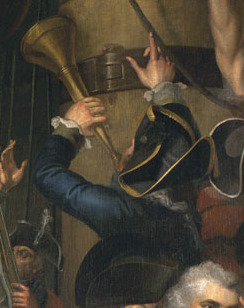
- Detail of Lord Howe on the Deck of the Queen Charlotte (1794) depicting Hamond holding a trumpet
- Born: 30 December 1779; London, England
- Died: 20 December 1862 (aged 82); Yarmouth, Isle of Wight
- Military career
- Allegiance: Great Britain; United Kingdom
- Branch: Royal Navy
- Service years: 1785–1838
- Rank: Admiral of the Fleet
- Commands: HMS Echo; HMS Champion; HMS Lion; HMS Blanche; HMS Plantagenet; HMS Lively; HMS Victorious; HMS Rivoli; HMS Wellesley; South America Station
- Conflicts: French Revolutionary Wars; Napoleonic Wars
- Awards: Knight Grand Cross of the Order of the Bath

Admiral of the Fleet Sir Graham Eden Hamond, 2nd Baronet, GCB, DL (30 December 1779 – 20 December 1862) was a Royal Navy officer. After seeing action as a junior officer at the Glorious First of June and then at the Battle of Toulon, he commanded the fifth-rate HMS Blanche at the Battle of Copenhagen during the French Revolutionary Wars.

Hamond became commanding officer of the third-rate HMS Plantagenet and captured the French ships Le Courier de Terre Neuve and L'Atalante in an action during the Napoleonic Wars. He took command of the fifth-rate HMS Lively and took part in the action of 5 October 1804, when three Spanish frigates laden with treasure were captured, and was then given command of the third-rate HMS Victorious and took part in the attack on Flushing during the disastrous Walcheren Campaign.

After a period of leave from the Navy, Hamond became commanding officer of the third-rate HMS Wellesley and conveyed the diplomat Lord Stuart de Rothesay to Brazil to negotiate a commercial treaty with the Emperor Pedro I. Hamond went on to be Commander-in-Chief, South American Station.

== Early career ==
Born the only son of Captain Sir Andrew Hamond and Anne Hamond (née Graeme), Hamond joined the Royal Navy in September 1785. He was recorded, as a captain's servant, on the books of the third-rate HMS Irresistible, his father's flagship in his role as Commander-in-Chief, The Nore and, having been promoted to midshipman in 1790, actually served in the third-rate HMS Vanguard, the third-rate HMS Bedford and then the second-rate HMS Duke. In January 1793 he transferred to the fifth-rate HMS Phaeton and assisted in the capture of Le Général Dumourier and her prize St. Iago in an action during the French Revolutionary Wars and received his portion of a large amount of prize money. He then joined the first-rate HMS Queen Charlotte, flagship of Earl Howe in his role as Commander-in-Chief, Channel Squadron, and saw action at the Glorious First of June in June 1794. He served in the fifth-rate HMS Aquilon and the third-rate HMS Zealous before transferring to the first-rate HMS Britannia, flagship of Sir William Hotham in his role as Commander-in-Chief, Mediterranean Fleet, in June 1795 and seeing action at the Battle of Toulon in July 1795.

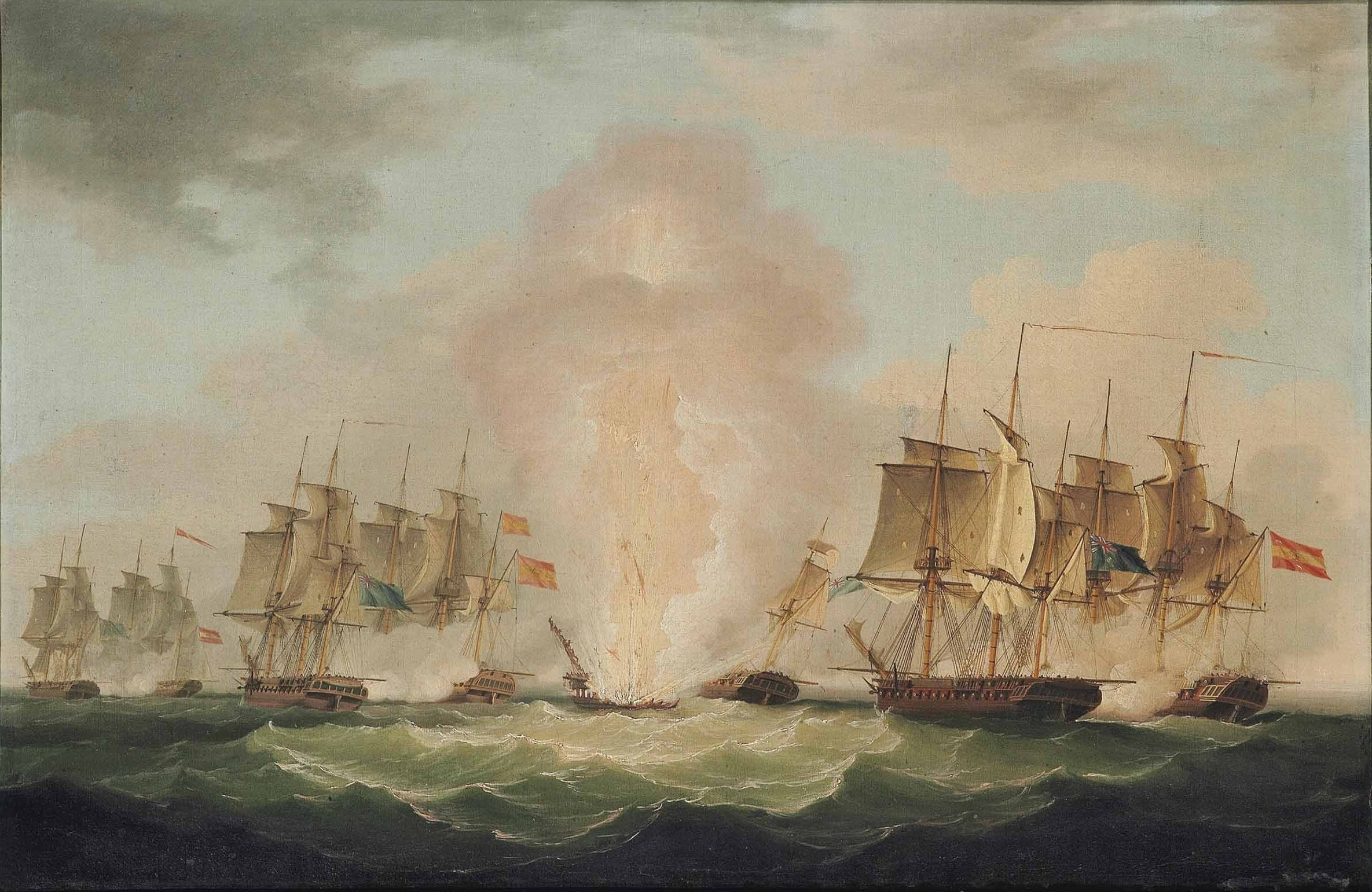
The blowing up of the Spanish Frigate Mercedes at the Battle of Cape Santa Maria, 1804, John Thomas Serres

Promoted to lieutenant on 19 October 1796, Hamond served in the fifth-rate HMS Aigle in the Mediterranean Squadron in Autumn 1796 and in the fifth-rate HMS Niger in Spring 1797. Promoted to commander on 20 October 1798, he became commanding officer of the sloop HMS Echo and was employed in the blockade of Le Havre and on different occasions took charge of convoys. Promoted to captain on 30 November 1798, he became commanding officer of the sixth-rate HMS Champion and captured the French privateer Anacreon in June 1799. Hamond described Anacreon as "almost a new vessel, sails remarkably fast, is copper-bottomed, and seems fit for His Majesty's Service." He then took part in the Siege of French-held Malta in Spring 1800 before becoming commanding officer of the third-rate HMS Lion later that year. He went on to be commanding officer of the fifth-rate HMS Blanche and took part in the Battle of Copenhagen in April 1801.

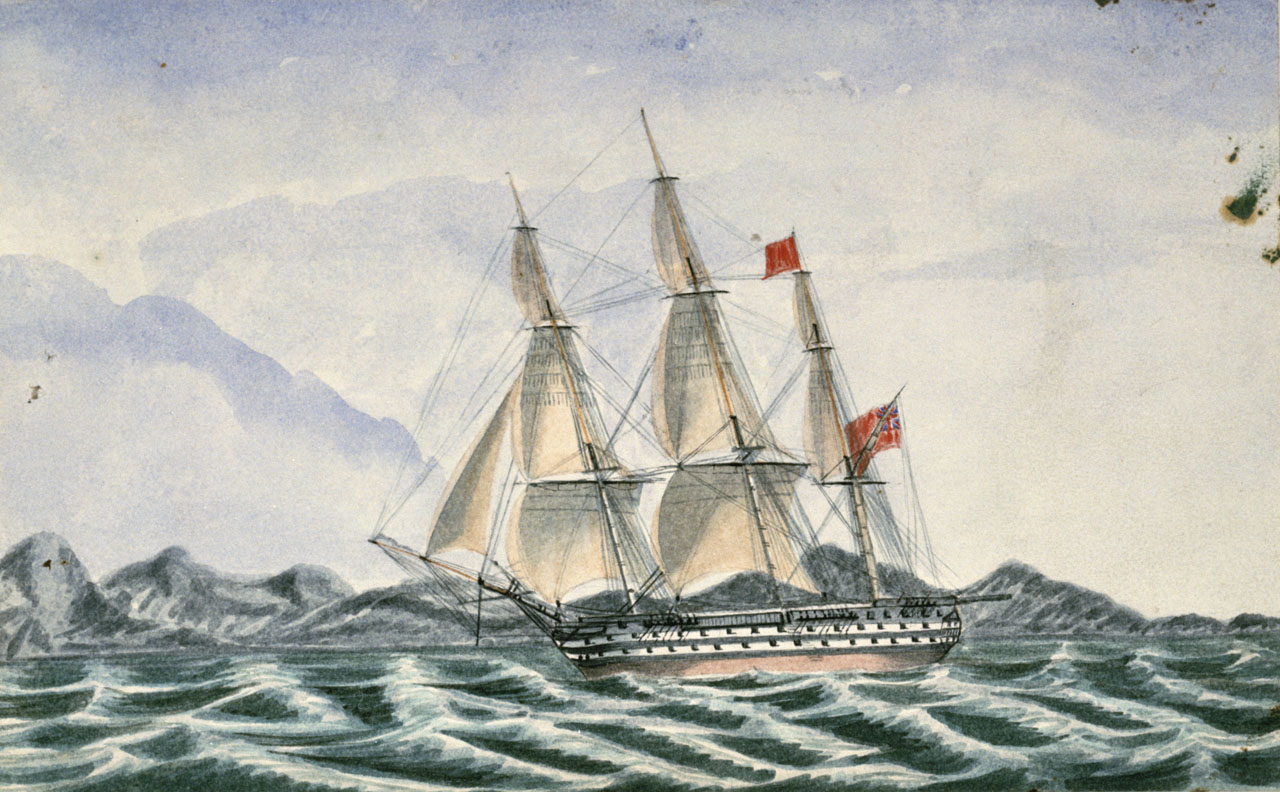
The third-rate HMS Wellesley in which Hamond conveyed the diplomat Lord Stuart de Rothesay to Brazil

Hamond became commanding officer of the third-rate HMS Plantagenet in February 1803 and captured the French ships Le Courier de Terre Neuve and L'Atalante in an action later that year during the Napoleonic Wars. He took command of the fifth-rate HMS Lively in July 1804 and took part in the action of 5 October 1804 when three Spanish frigates laden with treasure were captured. HMS Lively captured two other treasure ships, the San Miguel and the Santa Gertruyda off Cape St. Vincent and Cape St Maria respectively in December 1804. He went on to engage in a duel with the Spanish ship Glorioso in May 1805 and then to transport British troops to Naples in November 1805. He was then given command of the third-rate HMS Victorious on the Home Station in December 1808 and took part in the attack on Flushing during the disastrous Walcheren Campaign in Summer 1809. He went on to be commanding officer of the third-rate HMS Rivoli in the Mediterranean Squadron in May 1813. He was appointed a Companion of the Order of the Bath on 4 June 1815 and a Deputy Lieutenant of the Isle of Wight on 27 October 1821.

After a period of leave from the Navy, Hamond became commanding officer of the third-rate HMS Wellesley in March 1824 and then conveyed the diplomat Lord Stuart de Rothesay to Brazil to negotiate a commercial treaty with the Emperor Pedro I.

== Senior command ==
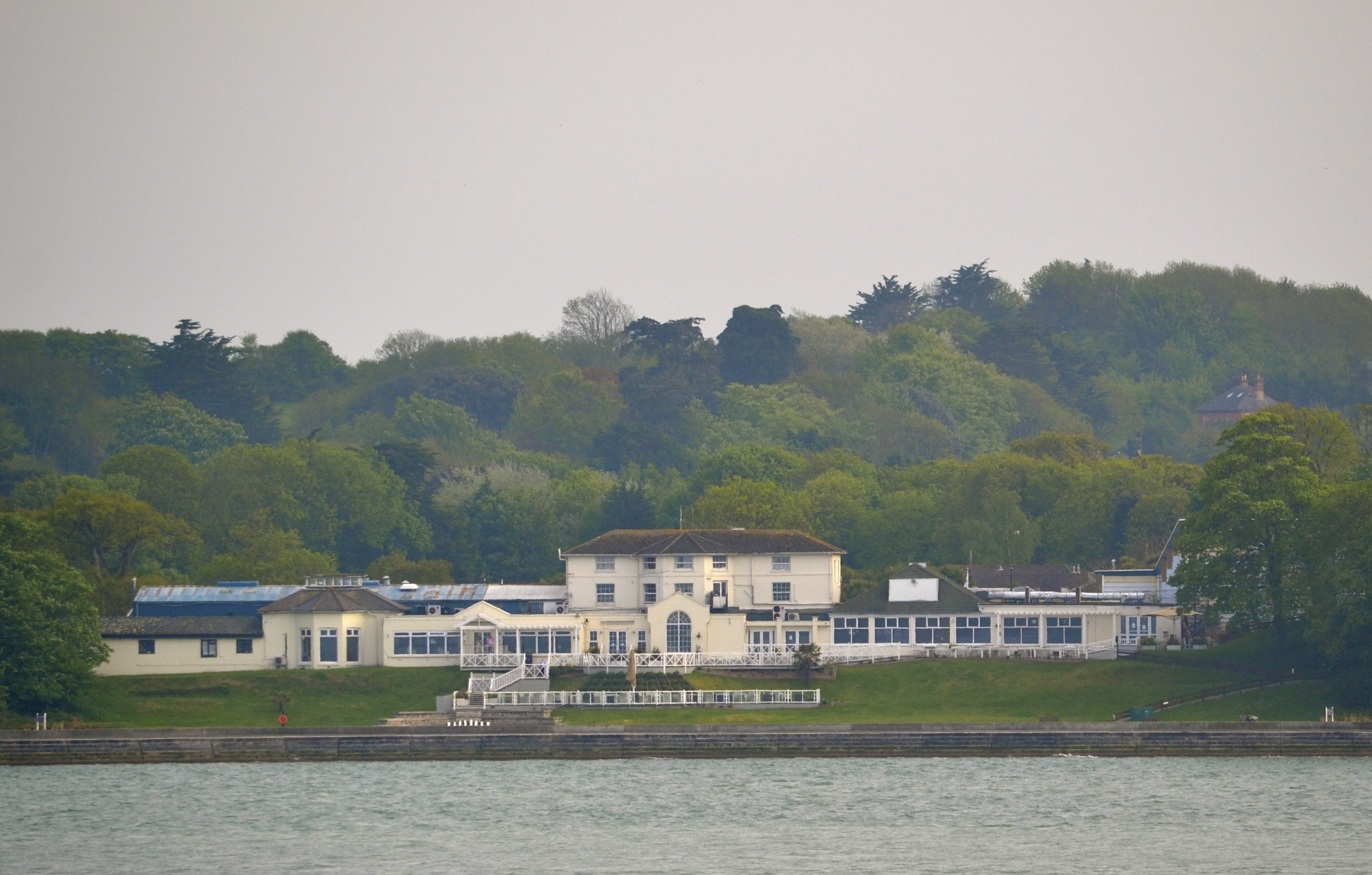
Norton Lodge (now known as Norton Grange), Hamond's home on the Isle of Wight

Promoted to rear admiral on 27 May 1825, Hamond travelled in the third-rate HMS Spartiate on his new mission to deliver the treaty of separation between Brazil and Portugal to King John VI of Portugal, upon which King John created him a Knight Commander of The Order of the Tower and Sword. He inherited his father's baronetcy in September 1828. He was advanced to Knight Commander of the Order of the Bath on 13 September 1831 and became Commander-in-Chief, South American Station, with his flag in the third-rate HMS Spartiate, in September 1834. Promoted to vice admiral on 10 January 1837 and to full admiral on 22 January 1847 he was advanced to Knight Grand Cross of the Order of the Bath on 5 July 1855. He was appointed Rear-Admiral of the United Kingdom on 22 November 1860 and Vice-Admiral of the United Kingdom on 5 June 1862 before being promoted to Admiral of the Fleet on 10 November 1862.

Hamond died at his home at Norton Lodge near Yarmouth, Isle of Wight on 20 December 1862.

== Family ==
In December 1806 Hamond married Elizabeth Kimber; they had three daughters and two sons, including Vice-Admiral Sir Andrew Snape Hamond-Graeme, 3rd Baronet.

== Sources ==
- Heathcote, Tony (2002). The British Admirals of the Fleet 1734 – 1995. Pen & Sword. ISBN 0-85052-835-6.
- OByrne, William R. (1849). A Naval Biographical Dictionary.

Military offices
Preceded by Michael Seymour	Commander-in-Chief, South America Station; 1834–1838	Succeeded by Charles Ross as Commander-in-Chief, Pacific Station
Honorary titles
Preceded by Sir Thomas Cochrane	Rear-Admiral of the United Kingdom; 1860–1862	Succeeded by Sir Francis Austen
Preceded by Sir William Hall Gage	Vice-Admiral of the United Kingdom; 1862	Succeeded by Sir Francis Austen
Baronetage of Great Britain
Preceded by Andrew Hamond	Baronet (of Holly Grove); 1828–1862	Succeeded by Andrew Snape Hamond-Graeme
