= HMS Weazel (1805) =

Brig-sloop of the Royal Navy

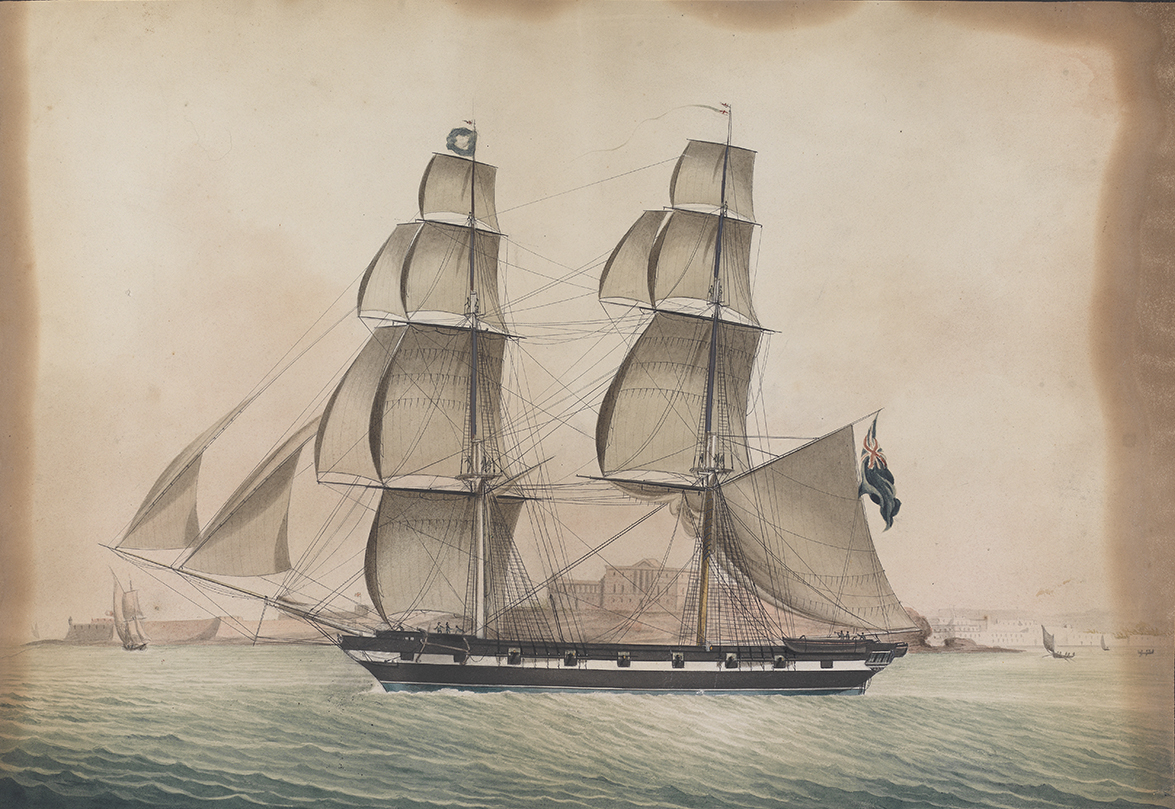
- H.M. Sloop Weazle going out of Malta

History

United Kingdom
- Name: HMS Weazel
- Ordered: 7 November 1803
- Builder: Thomas Owen, Topsham
- Laid down: February 1804
- Launched: January 1805
- Honours and awards: Naval General Service Medal (NGSM) with clasps: "Amanthea 25 July 1810"; "Weasel 22 Feby. 1812"; "Weasel 22 April 1813"
- Fate: Sold for breaking 1815

General characteristics
- Class & type: Cruizer-class brig-sloop
- Tons burthen: 38241/94 bm
- Length: Overall:100 ft 0 in (30.48 m); Keel:77 ft 3 1/2 in (23.559 m)
- Beam: 30 ft 6 in (9.30 m)
- Depth of hold: 12 ft 9 in (3.89 m)
- Sail plan: Brig rigged
- Complement: 121
- Armament: 16 × 32-pounder carronades + 2 × 6-pounder bow guns

HMS Weazel (frequently spelt Weazle, and occasionally Weasel) was a Royal Navy 18-gun Cruizer-class brig-sloop, launched in 1805 at Topsham, Devon. She saw active service in and around the Mediterranean during the Napoleonic Wars resulting in her crews earning three clasps to the Naval General Service Medal, was decommissioned in 1815, and was sold for breaking in 1825.

== Service ==
=== 1805-6 ===
Weazel entered service in 1805, under the command of Commander Peter Parker. Parker had been promoted to Master and Commander on 8 May 1804. On 21 August, Parker sailed Weazle to Cadiz, where he joined the British fleet under Lord Nelson. Weazle and Euryalus, under Captain Henry Blackwood, watched the port for the exit of the Franco-Spanish fleet, and signaled to Nelson when they did. Much to Parker's disappointment, Nelson dispatched Weazle to bring back five British ships of the line that Nelson had sent up the straits of Gibraltar to water, and whose absence, and the consequent weakness of the English fleet, Nelson had hoped would draw the enemy out. Weazel therefore missed the battle of Trafalgar.

Admiral Collingwood appointed John Clavell, with a commission dated to 22 October 1805, the day after Trafalgar, in which Clavell had been wounded, to take command of Weasel. (Clavell never fully recovered from his wound.) Weazel first monitored the Spanish fleet at Cartagena, Spain. She then patrolled Santa Cruz de Tenerife and Madeira, looking for Spanish privateers and men-of-war; subsequently she was stationed between Cape Spartel and Larache. From there Weazel transferred to the coast of Catalonia, where she captured the Spanish privateer Secondo Cornelo, of eight guns, though pierced for 20, and also about 15 coasting vessels.

=== 1807 ===
She then operated off Catalonia before serving in the Adriatic Sea and off Corfu at the start of the Adriatic campaign of 1807–1814. Clavell was visiting Corfu when word arrived that the island had been transferred from Russian control to France in the Treaty of Tilsit. Escaping from the newly arrived French garrison, Weasel captured or destroyed a number of French transports before bringing the news back to Malta.

On 4 March 1807, Ambuscade captured the ship Istria. Unité, Melpomene, Bittern, and Weazle were in company and shared in the prize money. Melpomene captured the Turkish vessel Buona Esperanza on 19 July and Bizzaro, on 21 August, with Unité, and Weazel sharing by agreement. (Note: A first-class share of the proceeds for a part of the cargo paid in July 1818 was worth £7 8s 1d; a fifth-class share, that of a seaman, was worth 9 1/2d.) The bankruptcy of the prize agents meant that some prize money was not distributed until 21 years later, in 1828. The fourth and final payment for Bizzarro did not occur until July 1850. (Note: A first-class share of the remaining prize money was worth £2 7s 6d; a fifth-class share, that of a seaman, was worth 3d.) On 5 October Weazle captured Alida Georgiana.

=== 1808 ===
On 4 February 1808, Henry Prescott was given command of Weazel and took command off Sardinia. Under his command Weazel took part in coastal operations off Italy and in hunting privateers in the Eastern Mediterranean. In August 1808 Weazle blockaded a convoy of 38 enemy vessels, of which four were large gunboats, in the port of Diamante, Calabria, south of the Gulf of Policastro, where they were protected by gun boats and a shore battery. The convoy was carrying contributions in kind from the two provinces of Calabria to the Neapolitan Government.

Lieutenant General John Stuart, commander of British forces in Sicily, detached Lieutenant Colonel Alexander Bryce of the Royal Engineers, together with 250 troops from the Regiment of Malta, 150 troops from the 58th Regiment of Foot, 50 men of the German Legion, and an artillery detachment of two 6-pounder guns and a howitzer. The naval force consisted of Weazle, Halcyon, and a Sicilian galiot under the command of the Chevalier de Balsamo.

Calms delayed the arrival of the troops for five days, for three of which the British forces were visible from the shore. Bryce reported that the town was well-situated for defence as it stood on a peninsula that was nearly inaccessible on three sides, the fourth was protected by "difficult Inclosures", and a building of "considerable Strength" commanded the whole.

On 9 September or early on 8 September, Weazle, Halcyon, and the galiot bombarded the building for several hours. The troops then landed on the morning of 8 September. They pushed back the defenders, who consisted of some French troops and 400 men of the civic guard. The defenders fled to mountains rather than trying to defend the town. Consequently, the British captured a battery of four guns, without suffering any casualties. They then captured the entire convoy, as well as a total of 20 guns, howitzers, carronades, and swivel guns, together with their ammunition. Before they left, the British destroyed the captured ordnance.

=== 1809-1810 ===
On 27 October 1809, Weazle captured the French letter of marque Veloce. Veloce was armed with four guns and had a crew of 83 men. She was four days out of Tunis and had not taken any prizes. Then on 25 December, Weazle captured Eole, a French polacre-rigged privateer corvette after a nine-hour chase. Though pierced for 20 guns, Eole was armed with fourteen 6 and 9-pounder guns, and had a crew of 140 men. She resisted for an hour and a half, during which Weazle had one man killed and one seriously wounded, and Eole had five men killed and nine wounded before she struck.

On 25 July 1810 the frigate Thames, Weazle, and Weazle's sister-ship Pilot were off Amantea when they captured or destroyed a convoy of 31 coasting vessels that were carrying stores and provisions from Naples to Murat's army at Scylla. Seven large gunboats, four scampavias, and an armed pinnace protected the convoy. (Note: Scampavias were a type of long, low war-galleys that the Neapolitans and Sicilians used at that time.) At the approach of the British vessels, the convoy beached itself between two shore batteries near Amanthea. The gun-boats and other armed vessels, under the command of Capitaine de frégate Caraccioli, drew themselves up in a line for the protection of the former. While the British ships fired on the batteries, the boats from all three that came in to take the enemy vessels out came under intense small arms fire from the crews, who had fled ashore, and local troops. Even so, the British only lost one man killed and six men wounded, one of whom belonged to Weazle. (Note: The British captured six gunboats, each armed with one 18-pounder gun or a 36-pounder obusier de vaisseau, two scampavias, one armed with one brass 9-pounder and one armed with one brass 4-pounder gun, a pinnace armed with swivel guns, and 28 transports. They sank a similarly armed gunboat and two similarly armed scampavias, and destroyed three transports. The British also captured 14 prisoners or deserters.)

For his role in command of the boats, Prescott received promotion to post captain, with the date of his commission being the date of the action, though he did not get the news until February 1811. Lieutenant Collier from Thames received promotion to Commander. In 1847, the Admiralty awarded the NGSM with clasp "Amanthea 25 July 1810" to the 23 surviving members of the British crews that claimed it.

=== 1811-1812 ===
In 1811 command passed to John Strutt Peyton, who took Weazel to the Aegean Sea, operating off Smyrna. On 29 August, Weazle chased a French privateer xebec for eight hours before capturing her. The privateer was the Roi de Rome (or Re di Roma), armed with ten guns and carrying a crew of 46 men. She was under the command of Enseigne de Vaisseau M. Antoine Michel, Chevalier de l'Ordre Royal des Deux Sicilies. Roi de Rome was only six days out of Alexandria (and only 46 days from her launching) at the time of her capture. She had set out after seven English merchant vessels bound for Malta and had captured a Maltese bombard.

On 16 February 1812, Weazel, commanded now by John William Andrew, joined the ship of the line Victorious off the harbour of Venice. Together the ships awaited the completion and departure of the French ship of the line Rivoli. On 22 February Rivoli left the harbour at the center of a squadron consisting of three brigs and two settee gunboats. In the subsequent Battle of Pirano, Victorious and Weazel chased and defeated Rivoli and her escorts. Weazel held off the small ships accompanying Rivoli and destroyed one, the brig Mercure, which exploded, while Victorious defeated and captured Rivoli.

Although casualties were heavy on both Victorious and Rivoli, Rivoli lost some 400 men killed and wounded of her crew of over 400, Weazel sustained no casualties. Her unfortunate opponent Mercure, lost all but three of her crew in the explosion that sank her. The action resulted in a promotion to post captain for Andrew. In February 1815 head money was paid out to both British vessels for the Mercure. (Note: A first-class share of the head money was worth £34 8s 7d. A sixth-class share, that of an ordinary seaman, was worth 5s 8 1/4d.) In October 1815 a second distribution of the prize money for Rivoli was paid out. (Note: A first-class share was worth £329 8s 10; a sixth-class share was worth £2 14s 8 1/4d.) In 1847 the Admiralty issued the NGSM with clasps "Victorious wh. Rivoli" and "Weasel 22 Feby. 1812" to the 67 and six surviving claimants from the action.

On 18 September Weazle captured the Bella Candiotta. (Note: A first-class share of the prize money was worth £136 1s 10 1/2d; a sixth-class share was worth £2 18s 11 1/2d.) Commander James Black replaced Andrew in September, but apparently after this capture.

On 21 December Apollo and Weazle chased a trabaccolo until it took shelter under the tower of St. Cataldo, reputedly the strongest on the coast between Brindisi and Otranto. (Note: Catald was an Irish saint who became bishop of Taranto and its patron saint. The tower had a telegraph, and was armed with three guns and three swivel guns. The next day a landing party from the two vessels captured the tower and blew it up. Unfortunately, the trabaccolo was unladen.)

=== 1813-1815 ===
Weazel remained in the Adriatic into 1813, assisting George Cadogan in Havannah in his raiding campaign on the Italian coast. On 6 January 1813, the boats of Bacchante and Weazle captured five armed French vessels sailing from Corfu to Otranto to convoy the payment for the troops on the island. The French resisted, but the British suffered no casualties. The five were: (Note: A first-class share of the prize money was worth £90 2s 9 3/4d; a sixth-class share was worth 15s 11 1/4d.) (Note: Indomptable (enseigne de vaisseau Eyffren), Diligente (aspirante de 2ème class Ballot), and Arrogante (officier de flotilla Baffert), were all built at Corfu-Govino, being launched in 1811, 1810, and 1811, respectively. Calypso (enseigne de vaisseau de Luce), was launched in 1812 at Corfu. Salamine was acquired c.1812-13 at Corfu; she was under the command of enseigne de vaisseau Benenquier. The identification of the officers comes from the Fonds Marine. The subsequent courts martial for the five French commanders barred all five from command for three years.)

- Indomptable, one 14-pounder gun, one 6-pounder, and 36 men under the command of enseigne de vaisseau Francis Eften;
- Diligente, one 14-pounder, one 6-pounder, and 36 men;
- Arrogante, one 14-pounder, one 6-pounder, and 40 men;
- Salamine, one 9-pounder, one 6-pounder, and 36 men; and
- Calypso, one 12-pounder, and 50 men.

Three days later, Weazle captured Madonna de Megaspilio. (Note: A first-class share of the prize money was worth £32 19s 10 3/4d; a sixth-class share was worth 14s 7 1/4d.) On 4 March, Weazle captured Sostegno. (Note: A first-class share of the prize money was worth £88 7s 7 1/2d; a sixth-class share was worth £2 2s 1d.)

On 22 April, Weazle was four miles ENE of the island of Zirona when she encountered a convoy close to the shore, making for the ports of Tran and Spalatro. Weazle gave chase, but the convoy split up, most of the vessels, including ten gunboats, heading for Boscaline Bay, between Tran and Marina. Weazle chased the gunboats, which around 6am formed a line, hoisted the French flag, and proceeded to fire on her. An all-day action ensued in which the French lost one gunboat sunk, two driven on shore, and three surrendered. However, four more enemy gunboats joined the action, as did shore batteries and troops on shore. Weazle further succeeded in burning and destroying eight vessels belonging to the convoy. The next morning the action resumed as Weazle, holed, taking on water, and with all her sails and rigging destroyed, slowly attempted to warp out of range. Weazle was unable to disengage until the late afternoon of 24 April. Weazle had lost five men killed and twenty-four wounded, with slightly over half the wounded being severely wounded, and with most of the casualties having occurred on the first day. (Note: A first class-share of the distribution of prize money in December 1815 was worth £160 15s 3d; a sixth-class share was worth £2 9s 8 1/2d.) In 1847 the Admiralty awarded the NGSM with clasp "Weasel 22 April 1813" to all surviving claimants from the action.

About a month later, on 24 May, the British sighted a French convoy sailing from Stagus to Cattaro. Rear Admiral Thomas Fremantle, who commanded British naval forces in the Adriatic, sent Weazle and the gun-brig Haughty after them. Weazle and Haughty captured or destroyed all six vessels in the convoy, suffering only one man wounded in the process. The six vessels were carrying grain.

On 22 July, Weazel and Saracen captured the Isle of Mezzo, which is about 15 kilometers northwest of Dubrovnik. There they captured six guns and 59 men.

During the night of 4 August, Milford and Weazel put a landing party ashore on the back of the island of Ragonicz, off the Dalmatian coast. By next morning the British had scaled the heights of the highest point on the island. From there they were able to drive the French garrison out of a fortification on the island. The landing party captured and disabled six 24-pounder guns and two 7.5" mortars before the party returned to their vessels, without having suffered any casualties.

Three weeks later, on 24 August, Weazel sighted five French gunboats that had left Fano and were sailing to Otranto. After a chase of six hours, Weazel was able to capture two, the other three escaping back to Fano. The two gunboats captured were Tonnante, of two guns and a crew of 40 men under the command of Enseigne de Vaisseau; M. Simon, and Auguste, also of two guns, with a crew of 27 men under the command of Enseigne de Vaisseau; M. N. Cranotich. The vessels also had on board 37 officers and non-commissioned officers from the French army, including a major, five captains, and ten lieutenants. (Note: A first class-share of the distribution of bounty money in December 1815 was worth £104 2s 9 3/4d; a sixth-class share was worth £1 15s 3 1/2d.) Commander Frederick Noel had been appointed to command Weazel in July, but Black was still in command at the time of these captures.

Between 18 and 31 October, a British squadron, consisting of Milford, Eagle, Tremendous, Mermaid, Wizard, and Weazel joined a force of 1500 Austrians to besiege Trieste. The siege was successful, with the Allied force capturing the town and its 80 guns. The operation cost Weazle two men killed and four wounded.

In November, Havannah, which had been attached to Freemantle's squadron, was detached to take the port of Zara with the assistance of Weazle. Captain George Cadogan of Havannah used the ships' guns to establish batteries armed with two 32-pounder carronades, eight 18-pounder guns and seven long 12-pounder guns. He then attacked the city and captured it with the aid of some Austrian troops. In all, they captured 110 guns and 18 howitzers, 350 men, 100 dismounted guns and 12 gunboats. Cadogan was later instructed to hand over all prizes and spoils of war to the Austrians. (This order cost the crews of Havannah and Weazle an estimated £300,000 in prize money.) The Emperor of Austria, however, awarded Lieutenant Hamley the Imperial Austrian Order of Leopold for his services at Zara.

On 9 December Havannah and Weazel destroyed 17 gunboats. (Note: A first-class share of the prize money was worth £197 17s 9 1/2d; a sixth-class share was worth £1 16s 8d. The two British crews also later received head money for the 373 men aboard the gunboats. A first-class share of the head money was worth £195 17s 9 1/2d; a sixth-class share was worth £1 16s 8d.)

On 25 May 1814, Elizabeth captured the French naval xebec Aigle and her prize, Glorioso, off Corfu. Weazel shared in the prize money though it was the boats from Elizabeth that actually captured the French vessels in an action that in 1847 earned for their crews the Naval General Service Medal with clasp, "24 May Boat Service 1814". (Note: A first-class share of the prize money was worth £61 7 1/4d; a sixth-class share was worth 9s 2 1/4d.) At the end of the campaign in early 1814, Weazel returned to Britain.

== Fate ==
Weazel was offered for sale at Portsmouth on 9 February 1815. She was sold for breaking up on 23 November 1815.
