= Jean-Baptiste Barré =

French naval officer

Jean-Baptiste Henri Barré de Saint-Leu (French pronunciation: [ʒɑ̃ batist ɑ̃ʁi baʁe də sɛ̃ lø]; 28 January 1763, in Paris – 11 April 1830, in Paris) was a French naval officer.

== Career ==
In 1792, Barré de Saint-Leu, then a Lieutenant, served in Terre-Neuve station under Pierre César Charles de Sercey, commanding the aviso Impatient which ferried Pouget, an official of Saint Domingue, from Le Havre, and cruised off Saint-Pierre et Miquelon before returning to Rochefort and Nantes. The next year, he commanded the corvette Perdrix.

In September 1796, promoted to Commander, he captained the brig Pélagie. In June 1797, he was appointed to the frigate Précieuse, in Brest.

Barré commanded the frigate Alceste during the Expédition d'Égypte. After the Battle of the Nile, he was sent to negotiate exchanges of prisoners with the British. He served with distinction in Egypt, and was awarded a sabre of honour for his conduct.

He was promoted to Captain on 5 February 1799, and appointed to Alceste in August. He transported military furniture from Alexandria to Jaffa, and ferried General Jean Reynier. Later, he was appointed to a squadron under Admiral Jean-Baptiste Perrée, which also comprised Junon, Courageuse, Salamine, and Alerte. In the action of 18 June 1799, Perrée's squadron met with a 30-ship fleet under Lord Keith and was captured. Alceste struck to HMS Bellona. In December, Barré received command of Égyptienne in December, ferrying troops and ammunitions to Egypt and conducting reconnaissance off Hyères.

On 10 July 1801, Barré took over command of the French forces in San Domingo, replacing Latouche-Tréville who had returned to France, sick, and presided until their surrender, in consequence of the Blockade of Saint-Domingue. In October 1802, he commanded the Surveillante.

In 1812, he commanded the French forces of the Adriatic, which fought at the Battle of Pirano, where his 74-gun Rivoli was captured after a fierce fight. Barré, who had sustained several wounds, was taken captive.

== Sources and references ==
=== Bibliography ===
- Roche, Jean-Michel (2005). Dictionnaire des bâtiments de la flotte de guerre française de Colbert à nos jours, 1671 - 1870. Group Retozel-Maury Millau. p. 344. ISBN 978-2-9525917-0-6. OCLC 165892922.
- Fonds Marine. Campagnes (opérations; divisions et stations navales; missions diverses). Inventaire de la sous-série Marine BB4. Tome premier : BB4 1 à 482 (1790-1826)
- Fonds Marine. Campagnes (opérations; divisions et stations navales; missions diverses). Inventaire de la sous-série Marine BB4. Tome deuxième : BB4 1 à 482 (1790-1826)
- Troude, Onésime-Joachim (1867). Batailles navales de la France. Vol. 3. Challamel ainé. pp. 160–162.
- Troude, Onésime-Joachim (1867). Batailles navales de la France. Vol. 4. Challamel ainé. pp. 160–162.
- James, William (2002) [1827]. The Naval History of Great Britain, Volume 1, 1793–1796. London: Conway Maritime Press. ISBN 0-85177-905-0. OCLC 165702223.
- L'Héritier, Louis François (1822). Les fastes de la gloire: ou, Les braves recommandés a la Postérité; monument élevé aux défenseurs de la patrie, par une société d'hommes de lettres, et de militaires. Vol. 5. Raymond.
