= HMS Ambuscade (1773) =

32-gun fifth-rate frigate of the Royal Navy

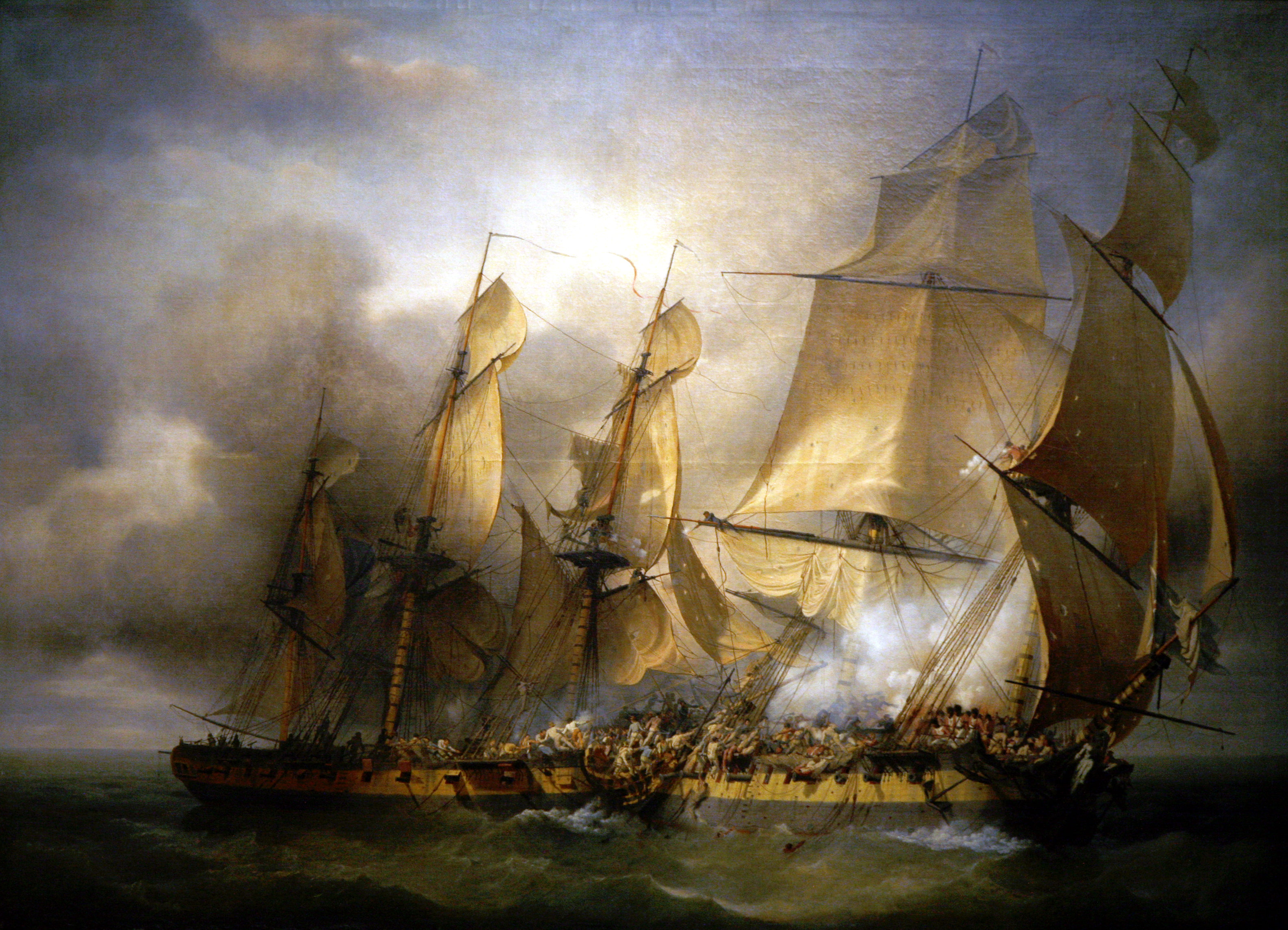
- Ambuscade (right) at the action of 14 December 1798

History

Great Britain
- Name: HMS Ambuscade
- Ordered: 25 December 1770
- Builder: Adams & Barnard, Deptford
- Laid down: April 1771
- Launched: 17 September 1773
- Commissioned: January 1776
- Captured: 14 December 1798

France
- Name: Embuscade
- Acquired: 14 December 1798
- Captured: 28 May 1803

United Kingdom
- Name: HMS Ambuscade
- Acquired: 28 May 1803
- Fate: Broken up in 1810

General characteristics as built
- Class & type: 32-gun fifth-rate Amazon-class frigate (1773) frigate
- Length: 126 ft 3 in (38.48 m) (gundeck); 104 ft 1 in (31.72 m) (keel)
- Beam: 35 ft 1.75 in (10.7125 m)
- Draught: 8 ft 4 in (2.54 m) (forwards); 13 ft 0 in (3.96 m) (aft)
- Depth of hold: 12 ft 2 in (3.71 m)
- Sail plan: Full-rigged ship
- Complement: 220
- Armament: Upper deck: 26 × 12-pounder guns; QD: 4 × 6-pounder guns + 4 × 18-pounder carronades; Fc: 2 × 6-pounder guns + 2 × 18-pounder carronades

HMS Ambuscade was a 32-gun fifth-rate frigate of the Royal Navy, built in the Grove Street shipyard of Adams & Barnard at Deptford in 1773. The French captured her in 1798 but the British recaptured her in 1803. She was broken up in 1810.

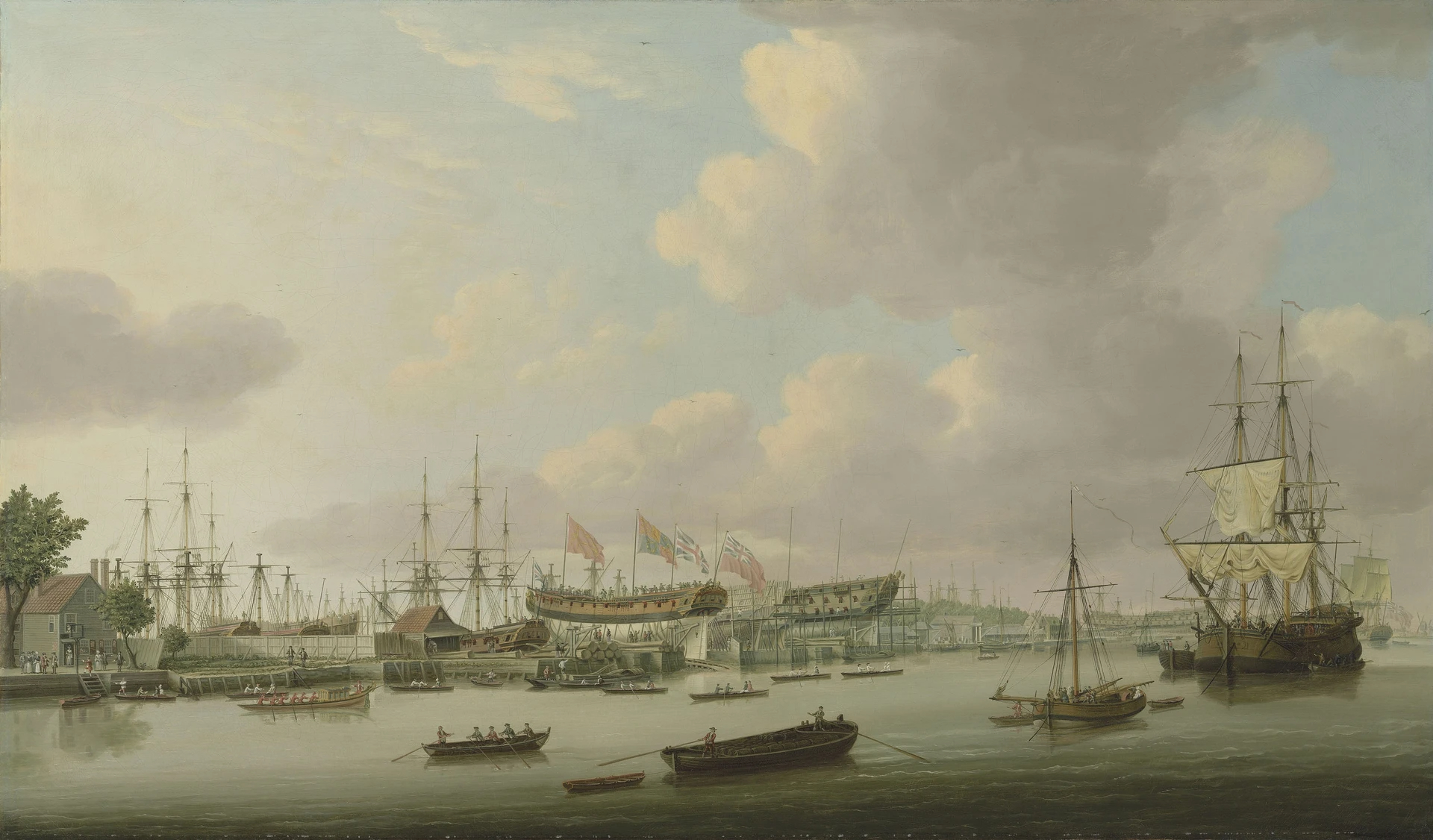
Ambuscade (centre) on the stocks at the Isle of Dogs in September 1773

== American Revolution ==
Sometime in June, 177 she captured the sloops 2 Brothers and Succsess in Massachusetts Bay. On 3 June she captured Swallow in Casco Bay, Massachusetts. On 18 June, 1777 she captured Hope in Boston Bay. Sometime in September, 1777 she recaptured Restoration in Boston Bay. On 1 October, 1777 she captured S. W. Erskine. On 19 May 1778 she recaptured the brig Mary. On 31 May 1778 she captured the American brig Charming Sally near Cape Sambro. on 11 June, 1778, under command of Capt. John Macartney, she recaptured brig "Carbonnere" (or "Carboneer").

On 22 June 1779, after a short action, Ambuscade captured the French brig Hélene, which was the former Royal Navy 14-gun sloop HMS Helena. The Royal Navy took her back into service under her original name. Six days later Ambuscade captured the French privateer Prince de Montbray. The privateer was possibly out of Granville and under the command of Captain Boisnard-Maisonneuve.

HMS Prudente captured the private man of war Américaine on 26 January 1781. She was armed with 32 guns and carried a crew of 245. Ambuscade shared in the proceeds of the capture. (Note: The prize money notice in the London Gazette gives a capture year of 1780, but this is a typographical error.)

== French Revolutionary Wars ==
Circa June 1797, in the Caribbean, Ambuscade captured the 32-ton, 3-gun privateer cutter Buonaparte, from Saint-Malo. She had a crew of 32 men under Captain F. Roussel.

In August 1798 Ambuscade, commanded by Captain Henry Jenkins, with Stag and the hired armed cutter Nimrod captured the chasse maree Francine . Then Ambuscade shared with Phaeton and Stag, in the capture on 20 November of the Hirondelle. On 13 December 1798, Ambuscade captured a French merchantman, Faucon, with a cargo of sugar and coffee bound for Bordeaux.

Disaster struck the following day. Ambuscade was blockading Rochefort, when the smaller French corvette Bayonnaise captured her at the action of 14 December 1798. The court martial exonerated Captain Henry Jenkins of Ambuscade, though a good case could be made that he exhibited poor leadership and ship handling. The French brought her into service as Embuscade.

== Napoleonic Wars ==
On 28 May 1803, HMS Victory recaptured her. She had a crew of 187 men under the command of capitaine de vaisseau Fradin, and was 30 days out of Cap Francais, bound for Rochefort. The Royal Navy took her back into service as Ambuscade.

In March 1805, she was attached to Sir James Craig's military expedition to Italy. Along with Dragon, Craig's flagship, and Lively, Ambuscade escorted a fleet of transports to Malta.

On 4 March 1807, Ambuscade captured the ship Istria. Unité, Melpomene, Bittern and Weazel (or Weazle) were in company and shared in the prize money.

== Fate ==
Ambuscade was broken up in 1810.
