= French corvette Bayonnaise (1793) =

French gunboat 1793–180

Bayonnaise
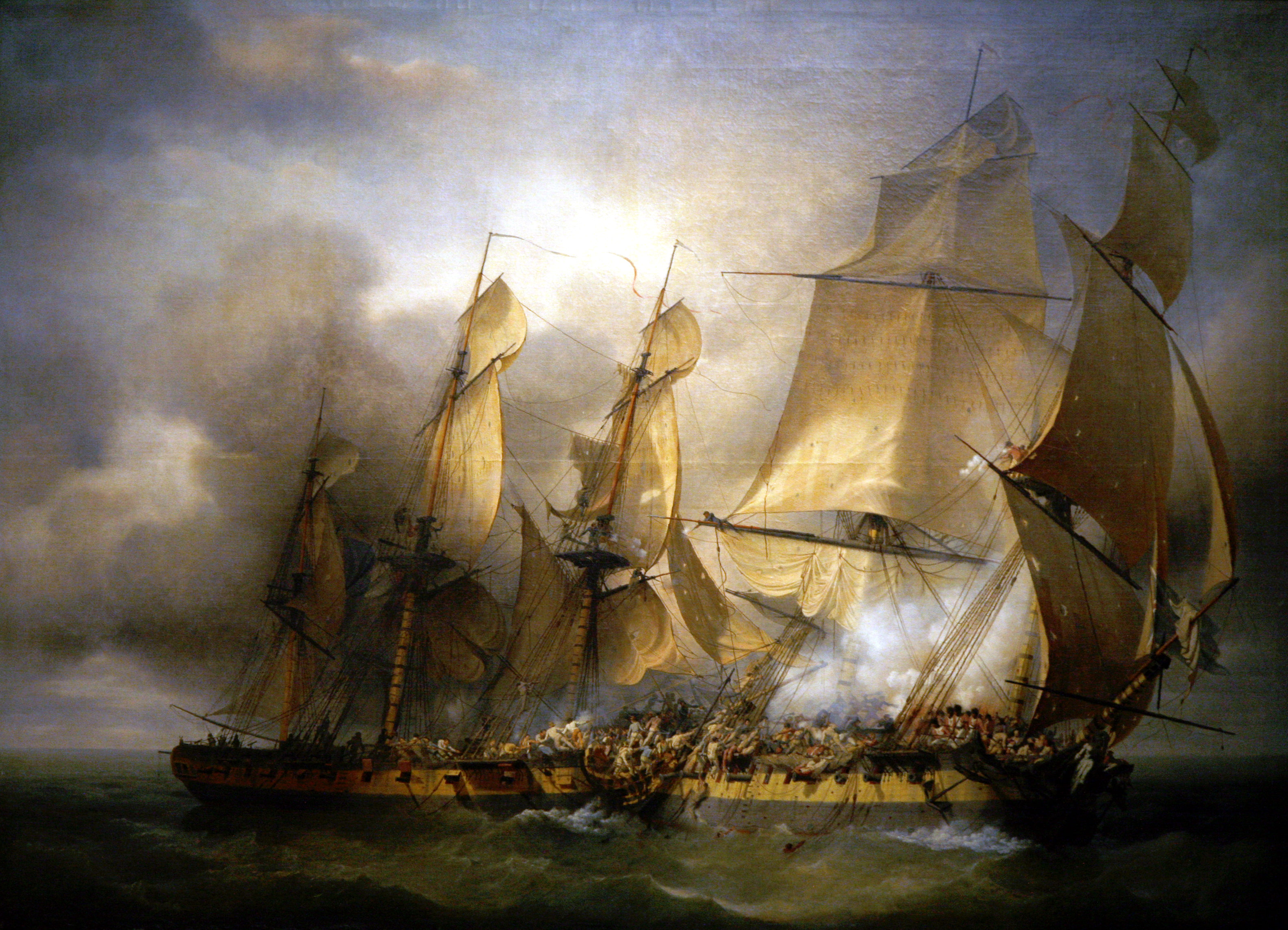
- Bayonnaise (left) ramming into HMS Ambuscade

History

France
- Name: Bayonnaise
- Namesake: Bayonne
- Builder: Bastiat, Dufouc, & Fils, Bayonne
- Laid down: March 1793
- Launched: September 1793
- Commissioned: March 1794
- Fate: Destroyed by her crew on 28 November 1803

General characteristics
- Displacement: 580 tons (French)
- Tons burthen: c.400 (bm)
- Length: 38 m (125 ft)
- Beam: 10 m (33 ft)
- Draught: 5 m (16 ft)
- Propulsion: Sails
- Complement: 172-386, or 220
- Armament: Originally: 24 × 8-pounder long guns + 4 × 4-pounder obusiers; By illustration:24 × long 8-pounders + 4 swivel guns + 2 × 32-pounder carronades; En flute: 6 × 8-pounder guns

Bayonnaise was a 24-gun corvette of the French Navy, launched in 1793. She became famous for her capture of HMS Ambuscade on 14 December 1798. Her crew destroyed Bayonnaise in November 1803 to prevent her capture.

== Career ==
Bayonnaise was being built as a privateer when the Ministry of Marine requisitioned her in 1793 before she sailed. The Ministry assumed the construction contracts and purchased her in March 1794.

Bayonnaise participated in the Croisière du Grand Hiver, an unsuccessful sortie by the French fleet at Brest on 24 December 1794.

Her hull was coppered in 1795 in Brest. She was officially renamed Brême that year, but apparently the new name was roundly ignored.

In late 1798, under lieutenant de vaisseau Jean-Baptiste-Edmond Richer, she ferried 120 prisoners from Rochefort to French Guiana. She then ferried troops and dispatches from Cayenne to Guadeloupe, and headed back for France.

She became famous for the action of 14 December 1798, in which she captured the much stronger 32-gun Ambuscade off the Gironde. Ambuscade was blockading Rochefort, when the smaller Bayonnaise captured her. Ambuscade had ten men killed, including her first lieutenant and master, and 36 wounded, including her captain. Bayonnaise had 30 killed, and 30 badly wounded, including Richer and his first lieutenant.

The court martial exonerated Captain Henry Jenkins of Ambuscade, though a good case could be made that he exhibited poor leadership and ship handling. The French brought her into service as Embuscade; the Royal Navy later recaptured her.

== Fate ==
On 28 November 1803, Ardent gave chase to Bayonnaise in Finisterre Bay. The corvette's crew ran her ashore and then set fire to her prevent the British from capturing her. Captain Winthrop of Ardent described Bayonnaise as a frigate of 32 guns and 220 men, which had been sailing from Havana to Ferrol. Actually, Bayonnaise was armed en flute with only six 8-pounder guns, and was returning from the Antilles.

== Postscript ==
Archaeologists of the "Finisterre Project" in August 2010 located Bayonnaise's wreck on Langosteira beach, Finisterre.
