= Norton Grange =

Coordinates: 50.70600°N 1.51348°W

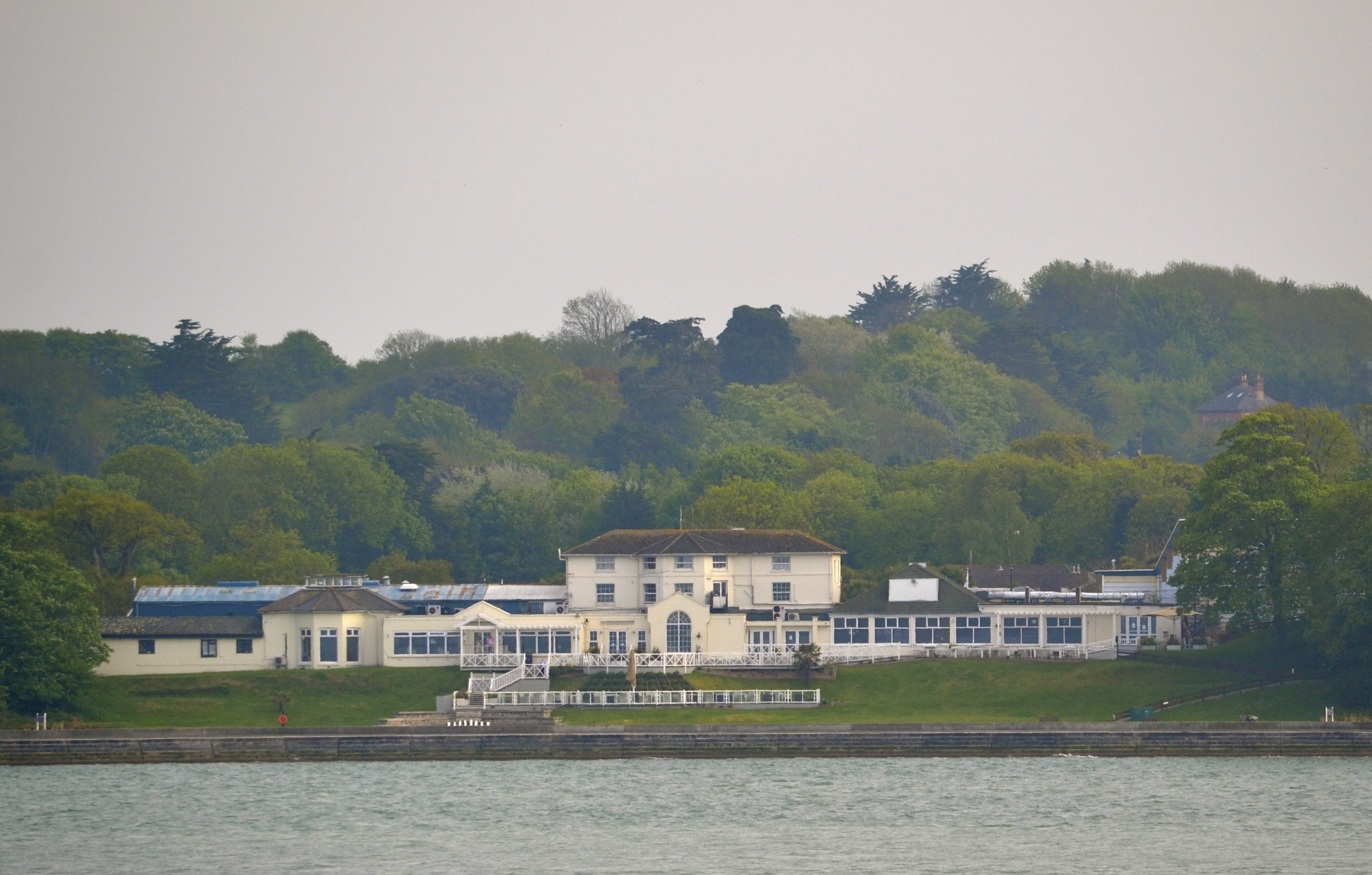
Norton Grange

Norton Grange is a country house near Yarmouth on the Isle of Wight.

== History ==
The house, which dates back to 1760 and was formerly known as Norton Lodge, was acquired by Rear Admiral Graham Hamond in the first half of the 19th century. It remained in the hands of the Græme-Hamond family until 1901 and then between the wars, as the Norton Chalet Hotel, it was owned by the Yelland family. During the Second World War, as HMS Manatee, it was a combined operations shore establishment used for the training of officers and ratings in the use of landing craft. It was acquired by Warner Leisure Hotels in 1966.
