= Action of 7 December 1804 =

Naval action during the Napoleonic Wars

- Part of the Napoleonic Wars
Date	7 December 1804
Location	off Cape Santa Maria
Result	British victory

Belligerents
United Kingdom	Spain

Commanders and leaders
John Lawford; Graham Hamond	Juan José Salomón

Strength
1 Ship of the line 1 Frigate	1 Frigate

Casualties and losses
Light	1 frigate captured

The action of 7 December 1804 was a minor naval action that took place at the beginning of the Napoleonic Wars. Royal Navy ship-of-the-line HMS Polyphemus (64) under the command of Captain John Lawford, and the frigate HMS Lively (38) under the command of Captain Graham Hamond captured the Spanish frigate Santa Gertrudis off Cape Santa Maria.

After the outbreak of war with France and Spain in 1804, the Royal Navy's HMS Polyphemus and HMS Lively were cruising off the coast of Spain and had captured several Spanish ships.

On 7 December a sail was spotted off the coast of Cape Santa Maria. Polyphemus and Lively intercepted and after a short action overhauled the frigate. The Spanish captain seeing that resistance was useless stuck the colours.

Santa Gertrudis a frigate of 40-guns, was armed only with fourteen, and was sailing from Peru and Mexico to Coruna when Polyphemus captured her. Polyphemus and Santa Gertrudis separated in a gale that damaged the Spanish ship, which nonetheless reached Plymouth on 10 January 1805, in tow by the armed defence ship Harriet, which had encountered Santa Gertrudis some days after the gale.

Santa Gertrudis was carrying $1,215,000, and merchandize. (Note: The amount that a seaman received in a prize money disbursement in May 1808 is difficult to read from the London Gazette, but the amount appears to be on the order of £34 5s 10d, or an amount equivalent to more than a year and a half of salary.) The prize money was shared, making the captains rich for life.

The Royal Navy took her into service as HMS Santa Gertruda, but did not commission the 40-year-old ship. Instead she served as a receiving ship.

== References, Notes & Citations ==
Sources

- Heathcote, Tony (2002). The British Admirals of the Fleet 1734 – 1995. Pen & Sword. ISBN 0-85052-835-6.
- Winfield, Rif (2008). British Warships in the Age of Sail 1793–1817: Design, Construction, Careers and Fates. Seaforth. ISBN 978-1-86176-246-7.
