= French brig Iéna =

History

France
- Name: Iéna
- Namesake: Battle of Jena-Auerstedt
- Builder: Rochefort
- Laid down: 1809
- Commissioned: 1810
- Stricken: 1812

General characteristics

The Iéna was a brig of war of the French Navy.

She took part in the Battle of Pirano, and escaped after the explosion of Mercure.

== Sources and references ==
=== References ===
- Roche, Jean-Michel (2005). Dictionnaire des bâtiments de la flotte de guerre française de Colbert à nos jours, 1671–1870. Group Retozel-Maury Millau. p. 249. ISBN 978-2-9525917-0-6. OCLC 165892922.
- Troude, Onésime-Joachim (1867). Batailles navales de la France. Vol. 4. Challamel ainé. pp. 160–162.
