= Action of 14 December 1798 =

1798 battle of the War of the Second Coalition

Coordinates: 45.404°N 2.319°W

- Part of the War of the Second Coalition
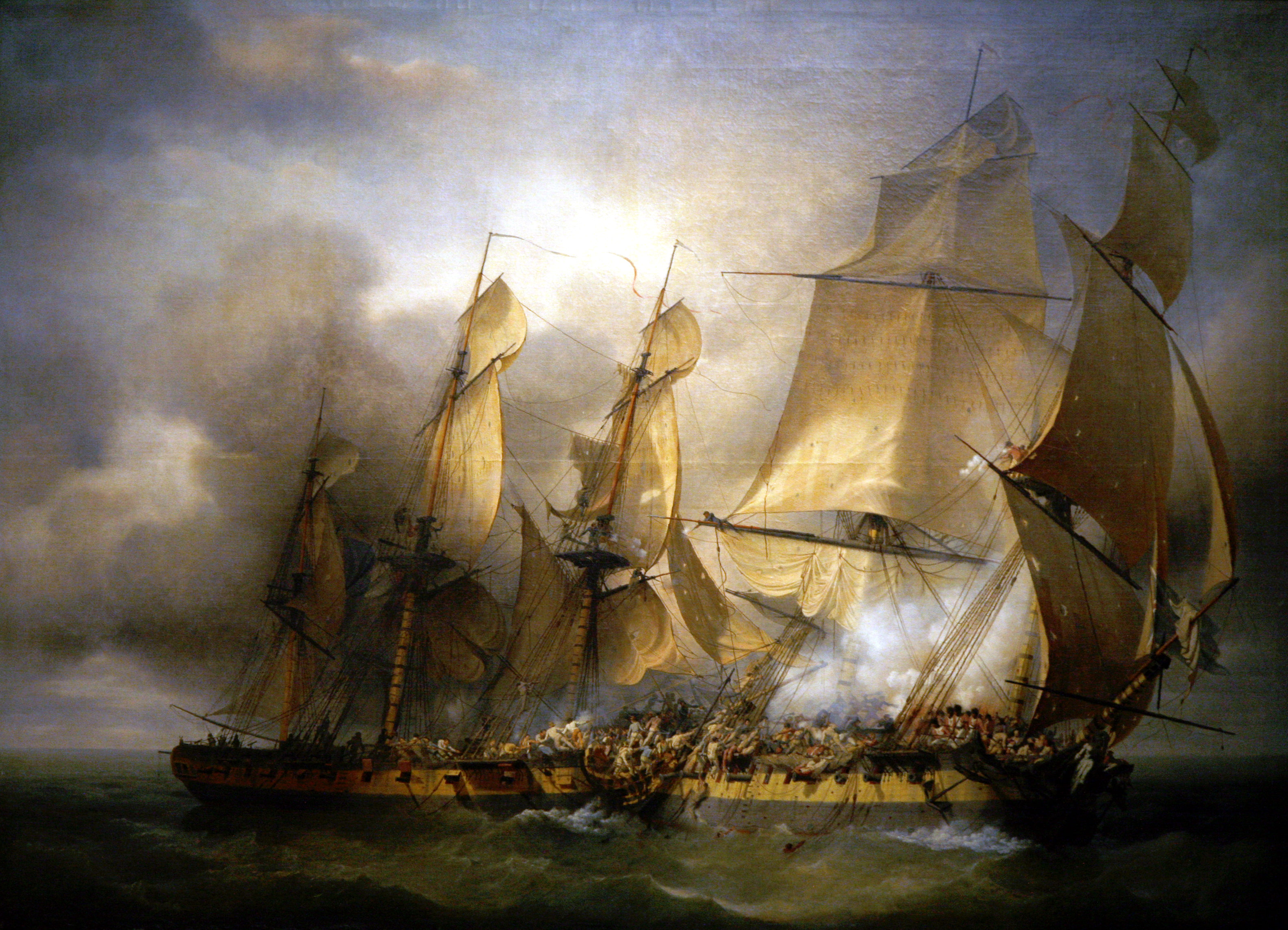
- Fight of the Bayonnaise against the Embuscade, 1798; Louis-Philippe Crépin, 1801
Date	14 December 1798
Location	Off Gironde, Bay of Biscay
Result	French victory

Belligerents
France	Great Britain

Commanders and leaders
Jean Richer	Henry Jenkins

Strength
1 corvette	1 frigate

Casualties and losses
25 killed 30 wounded	15 killed 39 wounded 1 frigate captured

The action of 14 December 1798 was fought between the 32-gun British frigate HMS Ambuscade and the 24-gun French corvette Bayonnaise during the War of the Second Coalition. Bayonnaise was vastly outgunned and outmanoeuvred, but boarded and captured Ambuscade.

== Background ==
On 14 December, as she sailed about 30 nautical miles (56 km; 35 mi) off Ré, Bayonnaise met the 32-gun frigate Ambuscade, cruising off Oléron under Captain Henry Jenkins. Ambuscade was waiting to meet with HMS Stag and blockade the Gironde estuary. Bayonnaise was a 24-gun corvette with a strong crew augmented by a 40-soldier detachment from the Régiment d'Alsace, under Army captain Nicolas Aimé.

At dawn, Ambuscade detected Bayonnaise and assumed she was Stag; Bayonnaise also detected Ambuscade, and, correctly assuming that she was a superior British warship, turned around to flee. From this manoeuver, Ambuscade understood that the sail was French and gave chase. Around noon, Ambuscade had closed in to cannon range, and the fight began.

== Battle ==
After one hour, the British had gained the upper hand, damaging the hull and rigging of the corvette. As Ambuscade came off the stern of Bayonnaise in an attempt to rake her, one of the British frigate's starboard 12-pounders burst. The explosion destroyed Ambuscade's boats, left 13 of her sailors dead and wounded, and confused the crew. Bayonnaise attempted to take advantage of the confusion to escape south, but Ambuscade gave chase again and caught up with the corvette around 3 PM.

As the frigate sailed on the port side of the corvette on a parallel course, overtaking her, Bayonnaise backed sail and turned hard to port, ramming Ambuscade. The bowsprit of Bayonnaise cut down Ambuscade's mizzen, wounding part of the crew standing on the poop deck, and entangling the two ships. Both ships fired a last broadside and closed their gunports. Bayonnaise lost numerous men, and her captain, Richer, had an arm shot off. Nevertheless, French grapeshot and musketry fire cleared the decks of Ambuscade. Most of the British officers were wounded and taken below deck, leaving only ailing lieutenant Joseph Briggs in command. Having grappled the corvette to the frigate, the French used Bayonnaise's bowsprit to bridge the gap between the ships and climb onto the taller Ambuscade.

The French boarded and seized a light gun loaded with grapeshot, which they used to clear the forecastle of its defenders. The quarterdeck of Ambuscade suffered the explosion of a powder box, which destroyed the wheel and the stern boat. After a bloody, 30-minute melee, purser William Beaumont Murray, the last British officer still standing, surrendered Ambuscade. During the battle, Ambuscade had had 15 killed and 39 wounded, including Jenkins and his two lieutenants, and Bayonnaise 25 killed and 30 wounded, including Richer and his lieutenant.

== Aftermath ==
Bayonnaise had lost almost all of her rigging, was leaking and had her rudder damaged. Ambuscade had lost her mizzen mast and sustained damage from explosions on board, but was otherwise intact and sea worthy. Ambuscade towed Bayonnaise to Pertuis d'Antioche and Rochefort. They arrived the next day. (Note: It has been reported that Bayonnaise broke her tow line and arrived only days later under improvised rigging.) Ambuscade was taken into French service as Embuscade.

Lieutenant de vaisseau Richer was promoted to capitaine de vaisseau (jumping three ranks), and the ensigns of Bayonnaise, Corbie, Frouin, Guigner, Kinzelbach and Potier de la Houssaye, were promoted to Lieutenant de vaisseau. Major Henri Louis Lerch was made Chevalier de la Légion d'honneur for his action during the boarding. Captain Jenkins was later court-martialled, accused of letting his ship, crewed by young sailors, be boarded by a stronger party, while he had a strong advantage at gunnery and manoeuvre. He was acquitted.

The battle was used as a propaganda effort by the French government. Several paintings of the event were subsequently commissioned, notably a large painting by young Louis-Philippe Crépin which is now one of the main exhibits of the Musée national de la Marine in Paris.

Representations of the battle in art and propaganda
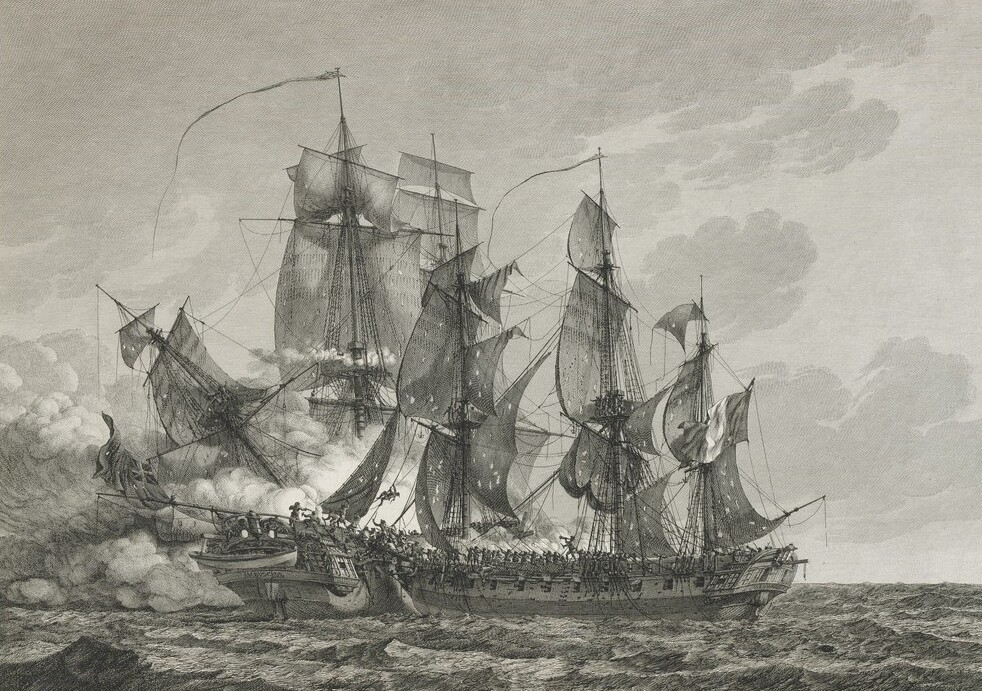
Pierre Ozanne's depiction of the battle

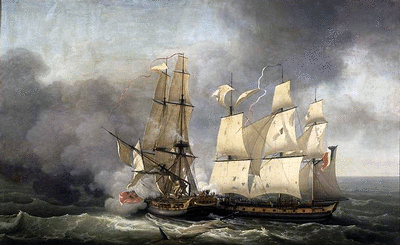
Jean-François Hue's depiction of the boarding

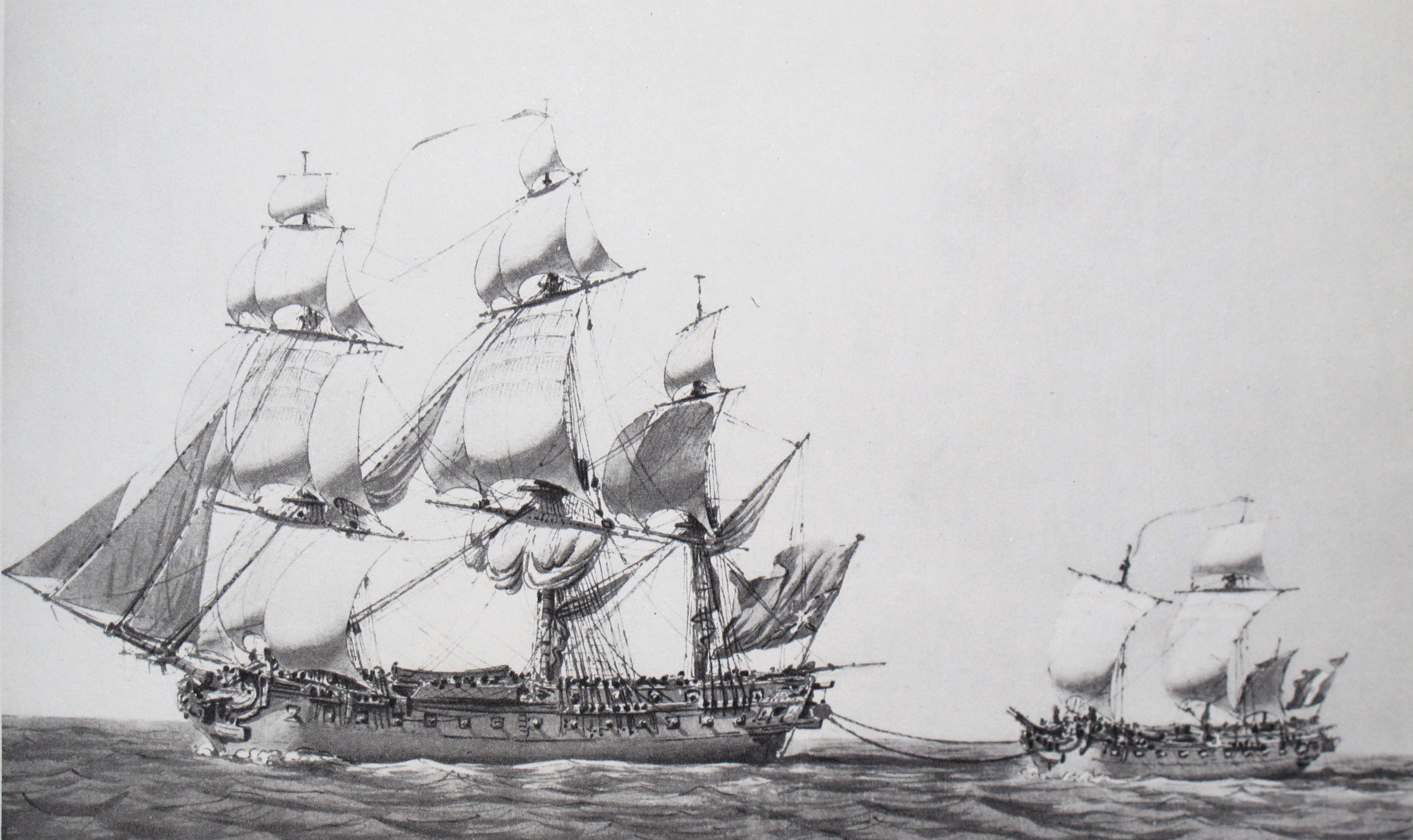
Ozanne's depiction of Ambuscade towing Bayonnaise back to harbour, with exaggerated proportions between the ships

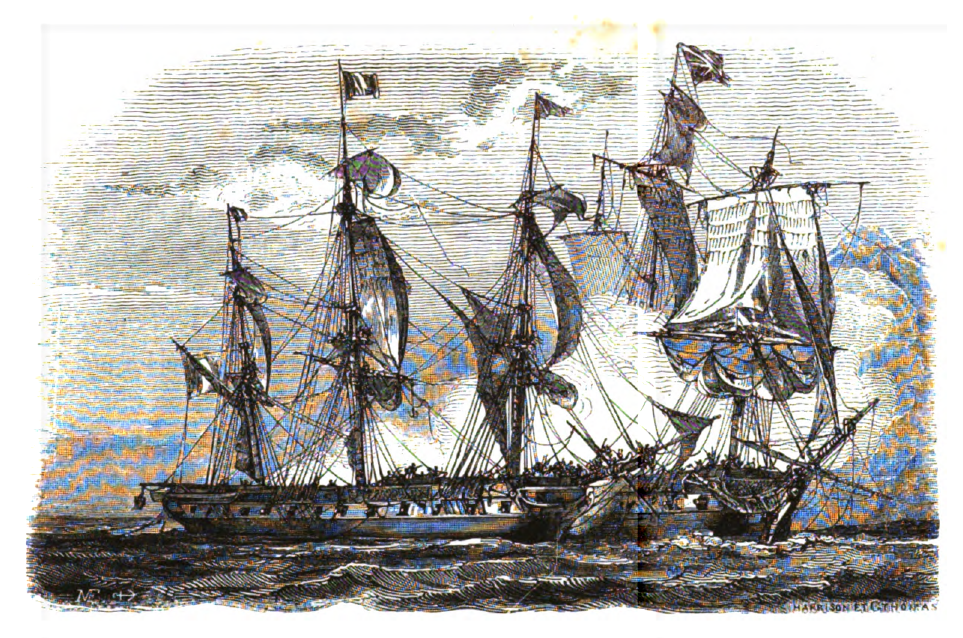
Antoine Léon Morel-Fatio's depiction, apparently inspired by Crépin's

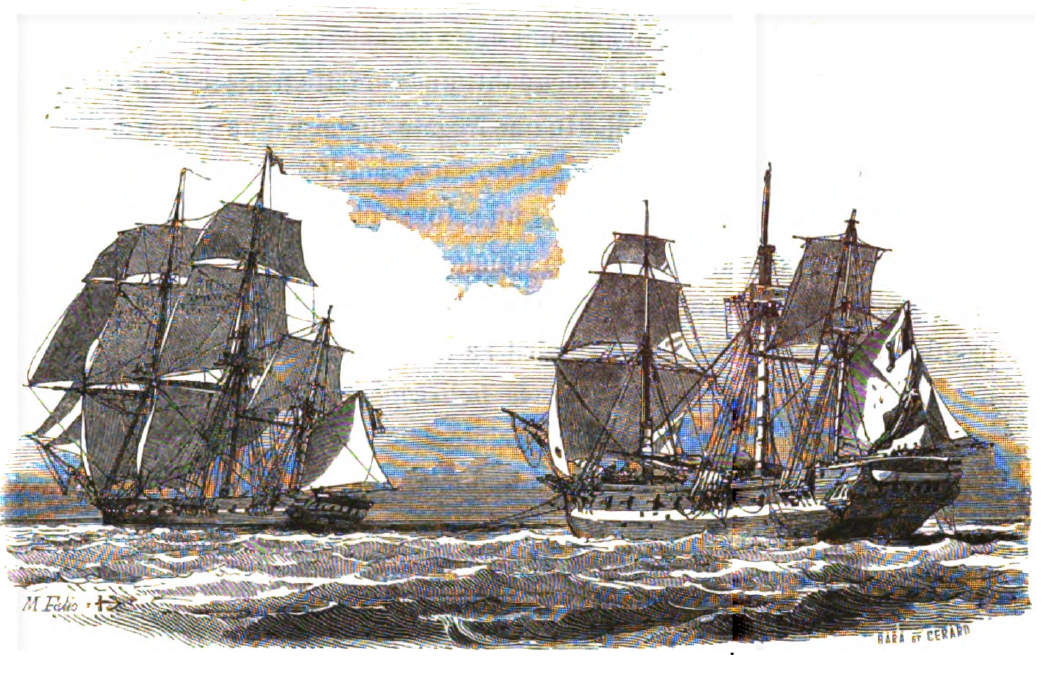
Morel-Fatio's depiction of Bayonnaise taking her prize in tow

== See also ==
- Action of 12 August 1782, a similarly unbalanced action between the 28-gun sixth-rate HMS Coventry, with a crew reinforced by soldiers, and the French 32-gun frigate Bellone. Coventry managed to avoid capture and make good her escape.
