= HMS Helena (1778) =

British sloop

History

Great Britain
- Name: HMS Helena
- Acquired: 1778
- Captured: France, September 1778
- Fate: Wrecked, 3 November 1796

France
- Name: French ship Hélene
- Acquired: September 1778 by capture
- Captured: Great Britain, 22 June 1779

General characteristics
- Armament: 14 guns

HMS Helena was a 14-gun sloop of the Royal Navy and briefly of the French Navy. Captured by the French Navy in August 1778 and recommissioned as the Hélene, she was recaptured for Great Britain by HMS Ambuscade on 22 June 1779. She ran aground on the Dutch coast on 3 November 1796 with the loss of all hands.

== Service ==
Helena was purchased by the Royal Navy in 1778. (She may originally have been a French vessel named Hélene.) The French captured her in September 1778, and took her into service under her existing name, or perhaps as Helene. HMS Ambuscade recaptured her for the British on 22 June 1779. A storm drove her ashore on the Dutch coast on 3 November 1796; there were no survivors.

== Sources ==
- Demerliac, Alain (1996) La Marine De Louis XVI: Nomenclature Des Navires Français De 1774 À 1792. Nice: Éditions OMEGA. ISBN 2-906381-23-3
- Hepper, David J. (1994). British Warship Losses in the Age of Sail, 1650-1859. Rotherfield: Jean Boudriot. ISBN 0-948864-30-3.
- "No. 12044". The London Gazette. No. 12044. 28 December 1779.
