= HMS Victorious (1808) =

Ship of the line of the Royal Navy

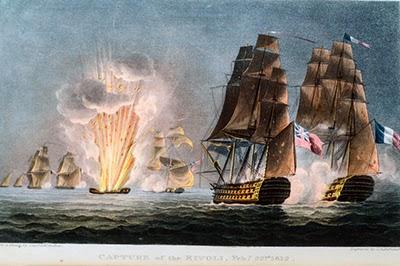
- Capture of the Rivoli 22 February 1812. Victorious is at the centre right.

History

United Kingdom
- Name: Victorious
- Ordered: 7 November 1802
- Builder: Adams, Bucklers Hard
- Laid down: February 1805
- Launched: 20 October 1808
- Fate: Sold, 1862

General characteristics
- Class & type: Swiftsure-class ship of the line
- Tons burthen: 1,724 6/94 (bm)
- Length: 173 ft 2 in (52.8 m) (gundeck)
- Beam: 47 ft 9 in (14.6 m)
- Draught: 18 ft (5.5 m) (light)
- Depth of hold: 20 ft 9 in (6.3 m)
- Sail plan: Full-rigged ship
- Complement: 590
- Armament: 74 muzzle-loading, smoothbore guns; Gundeck: 28 × 32 pdr guns; Upper deck: 28 × 18 pdr guns; Quarterdeck: 4 × 18 pdr guns + 10 × 32 pdr carronades; Forecastle: 2 × 18 pdr guns + 2 × 32 pdr carronades; Poop deck: 6 × 18 pdr carronades

HMS Victorious was a 74-gun, third-rate Swiftsure-class ship of the line built for the Royal Navy in the first decade of the 19th century. Completed in 1809, she played a minor role in the Napoleonic Wars.

== Description ==
The Swiftsure-class ship of the line was designed by Sir John Henslow, co-Surveyor of the Navy. Victorious measured 173 feet 2 inches (52.8 m) on the gundeck and 142 feet 2 inches (43.3 m) on the keel. She had a beam of 47 feet 9 inches (14.6 m), a depth of hold of 20 feet 9 inches (6.3 m) and had a tonnage of 1,724 6/94 tons burthen. The ship's draught was 12 feet 8 inches (4 m) forward and 18 feet (5.5 m) aft at light load; fully loaded, her draught would be significantly deeper. The crew of the Swiftsures numbered 590 officers and ratings. The ships were fitted with three masts and ship-rigged.

The ships were armed with 74 muzzle-loading, smoothbore guns that consisted of twenty-eight 32-pounder guns on her lower gundeck and twenty-eight 18-pounder guns on her upper gundeck. Their forecastle mounted a pair of 18-pounder guns and two 32-pounder carronades. On their quarterdeck they carried four 18-pounders and ten 32-pounder carronades. Above the quarterdeck was their poop deck with half-a-dozen 18-pounder carronades.

== Construction and career ==
Victorious was the third ship of her name to serve with the Royal Navy. The ship was ordered on 7 November 1802 from Henry Adams' sons Balthazar and Edward Adams and was laid down at their shipyard in Bucklers Hard in February 1805. She was launched on 20 October 1808 and completed at Devonport Dockyard between 7 November and 2 March 1809. Victorious was commissioned by Captain George Hamond in December 1808.

Her first action came the year after her launch, as part of the Baltic Squadron, in which she assisted in the bombardment of the port of Flushing (Vlissingen) in what is now the Netherlands. The naval bombardment was just a part of a much larger operation; the land force consisted of some 30,000 men, and the objectives were simply to assist the Austrians by invading the Low Countries and to destroy the French Fleet at their believed location of Flushing.

The town of Flushing was actually seized, but the whole invasion soon became irrelevant and pointless, for the French Fleet had actually escaped to the port of Antwerp, and the Austrians had been defeated and were negotiating peace with the French. Over 4,000 British soldiers were killed during the expedition, 106 due to combat, the rest because of an illness known as Walcheren Fever.

Her deployment to the Mediterranean saw Victorious engage in her first skirmish against a French warship, on 22 February 1812 in the northern Adriatic Sea during Battle of Pirano, against the French Rivoli, 74, which was eventually defeated with much of her crew being killed and wounded. Rivoli was captured once the skirmish came to an end and she later served in action as a Royal Navy warship against the French. Victorious won the lineage its first battle honour during this engagement.

On 12 October 1812 Victorious, was at 44°33′N 12°10′W. She was escorting a 30-vessel West Indies-bound convoy.

Victorious served as part of Rear Admiral Sir George Cockburn's fleet in Chesapeake Bay during the War of 1812. She participated in the blockade of the Elizabeth River, keeping USS Constellation at her berth in Norfolk, Virginia, during the conflict.

On 18 September 1813, Victorious arrived at Bermuda. The warship was decommissioned and placed in ordinary at Portsmouth Dockyard in March 1814. She was returned to service as a receiving ship in 1826, and broken up on 21 December 1861.
