= French ship Rivoli =

Ship of the line of the French Navy

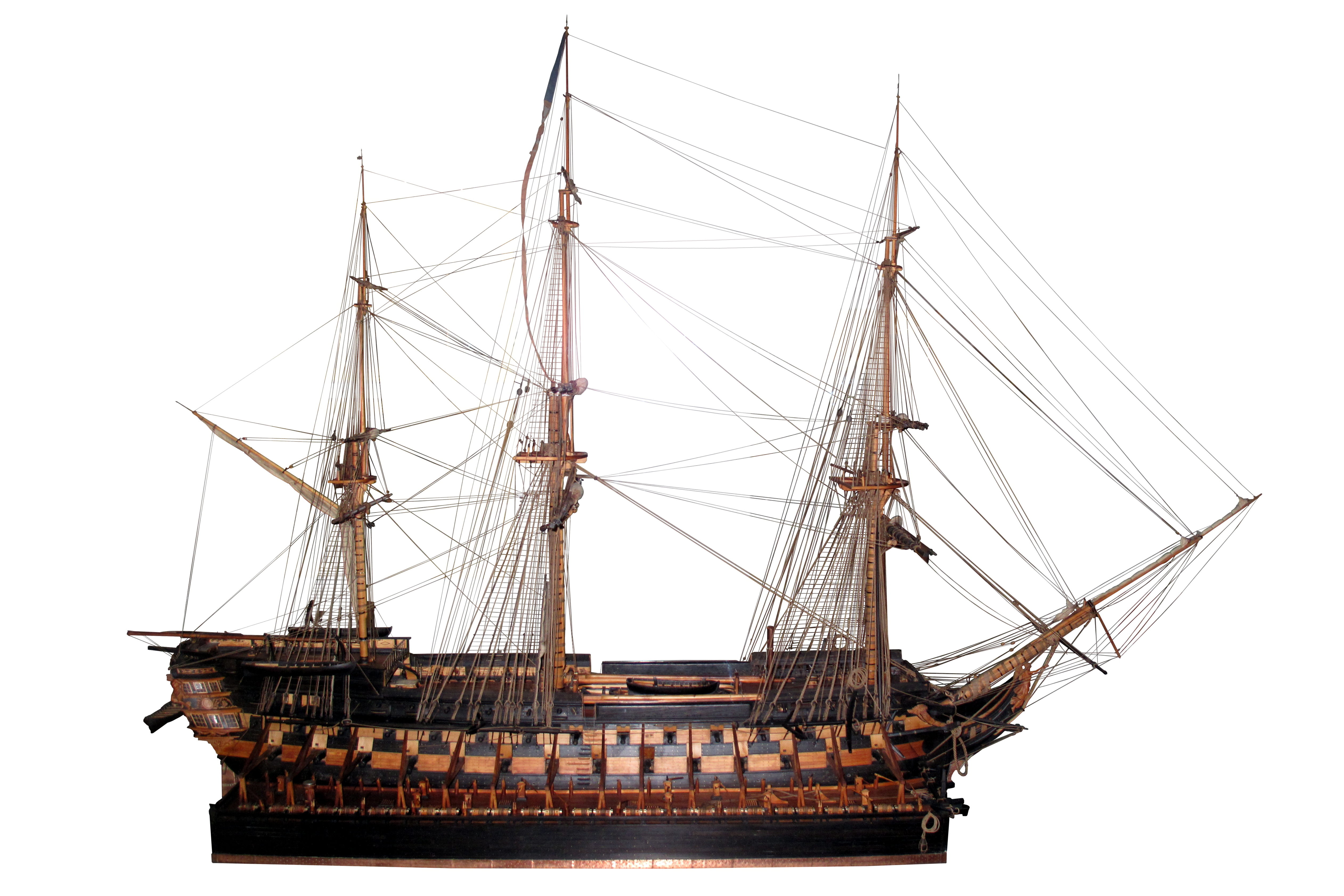
- 1/40th scale model of Rivoli fitted with seacamels.

History

France
- Name: Rivoli
- Namesake: Battle of Rivoli
- Builder: Venice
- Laid down: 1807
- Launched: 6 September 1810
- Captured: 22 February 1812

United Kingdom
- Name: Rivoli
- Acquired: Captured from the French on 22 February 1812
- Fate: Broken up 1819

General characteristics
- Class & type: petit Téméraire-class ship of the line
- Displacement: 2,781 tonneaux
- Tons burthen: 1,381 port tonneaux
- Length: 53.97 m (177 ft 1 in)
- Beam: 14.29 m (46 ft 11 in)
- Draught: 6.72 m (22.0 ft)
- Depth of hold: 6.9 m (22 ft 8 in)
- Sail plan: Full-rigged ship
- Crew: 705
- Armament: 74 guns: Lower gun deck: 28 × 36 pdr guns; Upper gun deck: 30 × 18 pdr guns; Forecastle and Quarterdeck: 20–26 × 8 pdr guns & 36 pdr carronades

Rivoli was a 74-gun petite Téméraire-class ship of the line built for the French Navy during the first decade of the 19th century. Completed in 1810, she played a minor role in the Napoleonic Wars.

== Background and description ==
Rivoli was one of the petit modèle of the Téméraire class that was specially intended for construction in some of the shipyards in countries occupied by the French, where there was less depth of water than in the main French shipyards. The ships had a length of 53.97 metres (177 ft 1 in), a beam of 14.29 metres (46 ft 11 in) and a depth of hold of 6.9 metres (22 ft 8 in). The ships displaced 2,781 tonneaux and had a mean draught of 6.72 metres (22 ft 1 in). They had a tonnage of 1,381 port tonneaux. Their crew numbered 705 officers and ratings during wartime. They were fitted with three masts and ship rigged.

The muzzle-loading, smoothbore armament of the Téméraire class consisted of twenty-eight 36-pounder long guns on the lower gun deck and thirty 18-pounder long guns on the upper gun deck. The petit modèle ships ordered in 1803–1804 were intended to mount sixteen 8-pounder long guns on their forecastle and quarterdeck, plus four 36-pounder obusiers on the poop deck (dunette). Later ships were intended to have fourteen 8-pounders and ten 36-pounder carronades without any obusiers, but the numbers of 8-pounders and carronades actually varied between a total of 20 to 26 weapons.

== Construction and career ==
Rivoli was ordered on 4 January 1807 and laid down on 14 March in the Arsenal of Venice, Italy. The ship was named on 11 May and launched on 6 September 1810. She was commissioned on 1 January 1811 and completed in October. Venice's harbour was too shallow for the ship to exit. To allow her to depart, Rivoli, commanded by Jean-Baptiste Barré, was fitted with ship camels to reduce her draught on 18 February 1812. Four days later, the ship was intercepted on her maiden journey the British 74-gun third-rate HMS Victorious. Her crew was inexperienced, and in the ensuing Battle of Pirano, the British captured Rivoli after some 400 men of her crew of over 800 were killed or wounded. The Royal Navy subsequently recommissioned her as HMS Rivoli. On 30 May 1815, under Captain Edward Stirling Dickson, she captured the frigate Melpomène off Naples. The ship was broken up in 1819.
