= List of shipwrecks in 1805 =

This list of shipwrecks in 1805 includes ships sunk, foundered, wrecked, grounded, or otherwise lost during 1805.

table of contents
1805
Jan	Feb	Mar	Apr
May	Jun	Jul	Aug
Sep	Oct	Nov	Dec
Unknown date

== January ==
=== 1 January ===
List of shipwrecks: 1 January 1805
Ship	State	Description
Caminha	Portugal	The ship was wrecked near Barmouth, Caernarvonshire, United Kingdom. She was on a voyage from Porto to London, United Kingdom.
Eliza	United Kingdom	The ship capsized while on a voyage from Halifax, Nova Scotia, British North America to Jamaica. Her crew were rescued.
Friendship	United Kingdom	The ship departed from Newfoundland for an English port. No further trace, presumed foundered with the loss of all hands.

=== 2 January ===
List of shipwrecks: 2 January 1805
Ship	State	Description
Little Tom	United States	The ship capsized at Madeira.

=== 3 January ===
List of shipwrecks: 3 January 1805
Ship	State	Description
Wasa Oretena	Sweden	The ship was driven ashore at Harwich, Essex, United Kingdom. She was on a voyage from Stockholm to Dublin, United Kingdom.

=== 4 January ===
List of shipwrecks: 4 January 1805
Ship	State	Description
Joseph and Son	United Kingdom	The sloop struck a rock off Dundee, Perthshire and was beached.

=== 5 January ===
List of shipwrecks: 5 January 1805
Ship	State	Description
Esther	United Kingdom	The ship foundered in the North Sea. Her crew were rescued. She was on a voyage from King's Lynn, Norfolk to Newcastle upon Tyne, Northumberland.

=== 7 January ===
List of shipwrecks: 7 January 1805
Ship	State	Description
Alexander	Ceylon	The ship foundered at Columbo with the loss of all hands.
Johrl	United Kingdom	The ship was wrecked at Cardigan. Her crew were rescued. She was on a voyage from Liverpool, Lancashire, to Kinsale, County Cork.

=== 8 January ===
List of shipwrecks: 8 January 1805
Ship	State	Description
John & Mary	United Kingdom	The ship was wrecked on Sable Island, Nova Scotia, British North America. She was on a voyage from Grenada to Halifax, Nova Scotia.
Mars	United Kingdom	The ship was abandoned in the Atlantic Ocean (37°51′N 56°00′W). Her crew were rescued by Guardian (United Kingdom). Mars was on a voyage from Cork to Philadelphia, Pennsylvania, United States.

=== 13 January ===
List of shipwrecks: 13 January 1805
Ship	State	Description
Burton	United Kingdom	The ship was driven ashore near South Shields, County Durham. Her crew were rescued.
Expedition	United Kingdom	The ship was driven ashore on the coast of the Isle of Man and was wrecked. Her crew were rescued. She was on a voyage from Liverpool, Lancashire, to an African port.
Heroine	United Kingdom	The ship was driven ashore at "Liscamore Mal Bay". She was on a voyage from Cork to Limerick.
Industry	United Kingdom	The ship was driven ashore in Sligo Bay. She was on a voyage from Sligo to Liverpool.
Leander	United Kingdom	The ship was driven ashore near South Shields. Her crew were rescued.
Minerva	United States	The ship was wrecked 11 nautical miles (20 km) south of Donaghadee, County Down, United Kingdom. She was on a voyage from Wilmington, Delaware, to Liverpool.
Perseverance	United Kingdom	The ship was driven ashore near South Shields. Her crew were rescued.
Royal Sovereign	United Kingdom	The ship was driven ashore and wrecked near South Shields. Her crew were rescued.
Sally	United Kingdom	The ship was driven ashore at Holyhead, Anglesey. She was on a voyage from Dublin to Parkgate, Cheshire.

=== 15 January ===
List of shipwrecks: 15 January 1805
Ship	State	Description
Portaferry	United Kingdom	The coaster was driven ashore at Portaferry, County Down. Her three crew were rescued. She was on a voyage from Dublin to Portaferry.

=== 16 January ===
List of shipwrecks: 16 January 1805
Ship	State	Description
Cato	United States	The ship was driven ashore and wrecked on Long Island, New York. She was on a voyage from Jamaica to New York City.

=== 17 January ===
List of shipwrecks: 17 January 1805
Ship	State	Description
HM Hired armed cutter Constance	Royal Navy	The cutter was wrecked in Roundstone Bay with the loss of two of her crew.
William	United Kingdom	The ship foundered with the loss of two of her crew. She was on a voyage from Jamaica to London.

=== 18 January ===
List of shipwrecks: 18 January 1805
Ship	State	Description
Liberty	United Kingdom	The ship was driven ashore at Scarborough, Yorkshire. Her crew were rescued by the Scarborough Lifeboat.
Stranger	United Kingdom	The ship foundered in the Atlantic Ocean while on a voyage from British Honduras to a British port. HMS Sagesse (Royal Navy) rescued the crew.
Union	United Kingdom	The ship was driven ashore and wrecked at Southwold, Suffolk. She was on a voyage from Southwold to London.
11 unnamed vessels	United Kingdom	The ships were driven ashore at Scarborough. Some of them were wrecked.
Unnamed	United Kingdom	The brig was driven out to sea from Scarborough with only two boys aboard. They were rescued by the Scarborough Lifeboat. She subsequently came ashore and was wrecked.
Unnamed	United Kingdom	The sloop was driven ashore and wrecked 2 nautical miles (3.7 km) south of Scarborough with the loss of more than eleven lives.

=== 19 January ===
List of shipwrecks: 19 January 1805
Ship	State	Description
Diana	United Kingdom	The brig was wrecked on Lung Island while on a voyage from Liverpool, Lancashire to an African port. There were at least two survivors.
Unnamed	United Kingdom	The brig was driven ashore on the Holderness coast, Yorkshire.

=== 20 January ===
List of shipwrecks: 20 January 1805
Ship	State	Description
Dispatch	United Kingdom	The brig was driven ashore and wrecked at Newton-by-the-Sea, Northumberland. Two soldiers assisting in the rescue of the crew died. She was on a voyage from Alloa, Clackmannanshire, to Sunderland, County Durham, or from Great Yarmouth, Norfolk, to Alloa.
John	United Kingdom	The brig was driven ashore at Beadnell, Northumberland.
Margaret	United States	The ship was driven ashore near New York. She was on a voyage from Lisbon, Portugal to New York.
Providence Increase	United Kingdom	The ship was driven ashore at Flamborough Head, Yorkshire. Her crew were rescued.
Swift	United Kingdom	The ship was wrecked on the Dudgeon Sand, in the North Sea with the loss of her captain. Survivors were rescued by Lydia (United Kingdom).
Unnamed vessels	Flags unknown	More than twelve ships were driven ashore and wrecked, or sank, at Gibraltar.

=== 21 January ===
List of shipwrecks: 21 January 1805
Ship	State	Description
Admiral Duncan	United Kingdom	The ship was wrecked at Naples, Kingdom of Sicily. Her crew were rescued.
HMS Doris	Royal Navy	Setting Doris alight. The fifth-rate frigate struck a rock in Quiberon Bay. She was set afire to prevent her capture by the French. Her crew were rescued by HMS Felix (Royal Navy) and an American schooner.
Stadt Altona	Hamburg	The ship was wrecked at Naples. Her crew were rescued.
Supply	United Kingdom	The ship was wrecked on the Maske Sand, in the North Sea off the coast of Yorkshire. Her crew were rescued. She was on a voyage from Littlehampton, Sussex, to Whitby, Yorkshire.

=== 22 January ===
List of shipwrecks: 22 January 1805
Ship	State	Description
Harmony	United Kingdom	The transport ship, a brig, was driven ashore on the Sandwich Flats. She was on a voyage from London to Portsmouth, Hampshire.
Mary	United Kingdom	The brig was driven ashore at Craster, Northumberland, and was wrecked with the loss of all hands. She was on a voyage from South Shields, County Durham, to London.

=== 23 January ===
List of shipwrecks: 23 January 1805
Ship	State	Description
Industry	United Kingdom	The collier, a brig, was driven ashore and wrecked at Berwick-upon-Tweed, Northumberland with the loss of two of her six crew. She was on a voyage from London to Boston, Lincolnshire.
John	United States	The ship was driven ashore at Spurn Point, Yorkshire, Ireland. She was on a voyage from Newcastle upon Tyne, Northumberland to New York.
HM Hired armed ship John	Royal Navy	The hired armed ship was driven on to the Skitter Sand, in the Humber. She was refloated and taken in to Hull, Yorkshire for repairs.
Mary	United Kingdom	The brig was driven ashore at Pendennis Castle, Cornwall, while on a voyage from Cork to Liverpool, Lancashire.

=== 24 January ===
List of shipwrecks: 24 January 1805
Ship	State	Description
Eliza	United Kingdom	The ship was run ashore at Boulmer, Northumberland by HMS Ajax (Royal Navy), which had mistook her for a smuggler. Eliza was on a voyage from Aberdeen to Newcastle upon Tyne, Northumberland. She was refloated and completed her voyage.

=== 25 January ===
List of shipwrecks: 25 January 1805
Ship	State	Description
Liberty	United Kingdom	The ship was wrecked at South Shields, County Durham. Her crew were rescued.
Lycka Ock Welgang	Trieste	The ship was lost near Trieste. She was on a voyage from Penzance, Cornwall, United Kingdom to Trieste.
Spy	United States	The brig was driven ashore at Cherbourg, Seine-Inférieure, France.
Vrow Margaretta	Denmark	The ship was driven ashore at Cherbourg.

=== 26 January ===
List of shipwrecks: January 1805
Ship	State	Description
HM hired schooner Lord Nelson	Royal Navy	The schooner sank at Dartmouth, Devon. Her crew were rescued.

=== 28 January ===
List of shipwrecks: 28 January 1805
Ship	State	Description
Edgell	United Kingdom	The ship was driven ashore and wrecked at Lisbon, Portugal.
Goodridge	United Kingdom	The ship was driven ashore and severely damaged at Lisbon.
Hibernia	United Kingdom	The ship was wrecked whilst on a voyage from Boston, Massachusetts, United States to Trinidad.
Nancy	United Kingdom	The ship was driven ashore and severely damaged at Lisbon.
Nostra Señora de Carno	Spain	The ship, which had been captured by HMS Uranie (Royal Navy) and sent in to the Tagus, was lost in the Tagus on this date. She was on a voyage from Havana, Cuba to Barcelona.
Two Brothers	United Kingdom	The ship was driven ashore 2 nautical miles (3.7 km) south of Scarborough, Yorkshire and was wrecked with the loss of three of her crew.

=== 29 January ===
List of shipwrecks: 29 January 1805
Ship	State	Description
Atalanta	United Kingdom	The ship was lost at Torbay, Newfoundland, British North America. She was on a voyage from Grenada to Halifax, Nova Scotia, British North America.
George	United States	The brig was lost at the mouth of the Garonne, France.
Hamilton	United States	The full-rigged ship was driven ashore at the mouth of the Garonne.
Mary	United Kingdom	The ship was driven ashore at Gibraltar.
16 unnamed vessels	Flags unknown	The ships were driven ashore and wrecked at Gibraltar.

=== 30 January ===
List of shipwrecks: 30 January 1805
Ship	State	Description
HMS Raven	Royal Navy	The Cruizer-class brig-sloop was driven ashore and wrecked at Santa Catalina, Spain with the loss of two of her crew.
Salsbury	United Kingdom	The ship was wrecked off Sheet Harbour, Nova Scotia, British North America with the loss of nine of her crew. She was on a voyage from Havana, Cuba to New Providence, New Jersey, United States and Liverpool, Lancashire.

=== 31 January ===
List of shipwrecks: 31 January 1805
Ship	State	Description
Fame	United Kingdom	The privateer frigate was driven ashore and wrecked at Guernsey, Channel Islands. Her 150 crew were rescued.

=== Unknown date ===
List of shipwrecks: Unknown date in January 1805
Ship	State	Description
Apollo	Spain	The brig foundered in the Atlantic Ocean (51°30′N 16°20′W). All seven crew were rescued by HMS Fisgard (Royal Navy).
Charlton	United Kingdom	The ship was driven ashore and wrecked on Dragør, Denmark.
Couriere	United Kingdom	The ship was wrecked on Newfoundland, British North America. She was on a voyage from London to Newfoundland.
Duke of Clarence	United Kingdom	The privateer was driven ashore and severely damaged in the River Mersey at Seacombe, Cheshire.
Earl of Liverpool	United Kingdom	The ship was captured by a French Navy frigate but subsequently foundered off the coast of Spain. She was on a voyage from Liverpool to Africa.
Earth	United Kingdom	The sloop was driven ashore at Great Yarmouth, Norfolk. She was on a voyage from Boston, Lincolnshire, to London.
Edgell	United Kingdom	The ship was wrecked in a storm at Lisbon, Portugal.
Eliza	United States	The ship was driven ashore near Baltimore, Maryland. She was on a voyage from Amsterdam, North Holland, Batavian Republic, to Baltimore.
Equity	United Kingdom	The ship was driven ashore and damaged on the coast of Sweden. She was on a voyage from Riga to Hull. Equity was later refloated.
Fly	United Kingdom	The ship was driven ashore and wrecked at Weymouth, Dorset. She was on a voyage from London to Bridport, Dorset.
HM Hired armed ship Flying Fish	Royal Navy	The hired armed schooner was run down and sunk by HMS Aigle (Royal Navy). Her crew were rescued by HMS Aigle.
Fortitude	United Kingdom	The ship was driven ashore and wrecked at Helsingør, Denmark.
Fortuna	Hamburg	The ship was driven ashore near Gravelines, Nord, France. She was on a voyage from Hamburg to Liverpool.
Frederica Dorothea	Denmark-Norway	The ship foundered while on a voyage from Bordeaux, Gironde, France to London. HMS Aigle (Royal Navy), rescued the crew.
Gebruder	Flag unknown	The ship was driven ashore in Dublin Bay. She was on a voyage from Lisbon to Dublin.
George	United Kingdom	The ship foundered in the Irish Sea off the Isle of Man with the loss of all but one of her crew. She was on a voyage from Liverpool to Galway.
Goodridge	United Kingdom	The ship was severely damaged in a storm at Lisbon.
Hasodlass	United Kingdom	The ship was lost near Kinsale, County Cork. She was on a voyage from Caernarfon to London.
Hambro' Packet	United Kingdom	The ship was wrecked on Gotland, Sweden. She was on a voyage from Riga, Russia to Hull, Yorkshire.
Hebe	(United Kingdom of Great Britain and Ireland) Guernsey	War of the Third Coalition: The ship was captured and burnt by the privateers General Perignon and Sorcière (both France).
Henry	United Kingdom	The ship struck rocks off the Isles of Scilly and sank. She was on a voyage from Liverpool, Lancashire, to London.
Indefatigable	United Kingdom	The ship was driven ashore at Biddeford, Devon. She was on a voyage from Norway to Biddeford.
Jane	United Kingdom	The ship was driven ashore on the coast of Scotland and was wrecked. She was on a voyage from Quebec City, Lower Canada, British North America to Liverpool.
John Bartlette	United Kingdom	The ship was wrecked at The Rosses, County Donegal with the loss of all but four of those on board. She was on a voyage from Cork to Limerick.
Hanus	United Kingdom	The ship was abandoned in the Atlantic Ocean. Her crew survived.
Jervis	United Kingdom	The ship was driven ashore and wrecked at Great Yarmouth. She was on a voyage from Neath, Glamorgan, to King's Lynn, Norfolk.
Johanna	Denmark-Norway	The ship was wrecked on Læsø. She was on a voyage from Copenhagen to Saint Croix, Virgin Islands.
John	United Kingdom	The ship was driven ashore at Cardigan. She was on a voyage from Liverpool to Kinsale.
Katty	United States	The ship was lost at Jamaica.
Lady Andover	United Kingdom	The ship was driven ashore and severely damaged near King's Lynn. She was on a voyage from Newcastle upon Tyne, Northumberland to King's Lynn.
Loch Ryan	United Kingdom	The ship was lost at Vila Franca do Campo, Azores.
Maria	United Kingdom	The ship was driven ashore near Hartlepool, County Durham. She was on a voyage from Alnmouth, Northumberland to London. She was refloated.
Mary	United Kingdom	The ship was driven ashore at Falmouth, Cornwall. She was on a voyage from Cork to London.
Mary	United Kingdom	The ship was driven ashore at Brighton, Sussex.
Mary Ann	United Kingdom	The ship was wrecked near Salcombe, Devon. She was on a voyage from Swansea, Glamorgan to Exeter, Devon.
Mayflower	United Kingdom	The ship sprang a leak and foundered in the Irish Sea off Ravenglass, Cumberland in late January. Her crew were rescued. She was on a voyage from Dumfries to Liverpool.
Mediator	United Kingdom	The ship struck an anchor and sank at South Shields, County Durham.
Nabby	United Kingdom	The ship sprang a leak while on a voyage from Liverpool to Boston, Massachusetts, United States. She put into Bantry Bay, where she sank.
Nancy	United Kingdom	The ship was severely damaged in a storm at Lisbon.
Nancy	United Kingdom	War of the Third Coalition: The ship was captured and burnt by the privateers General Perignon and Sorcière (both France).
Nicholson	United Kingdom	The slave ship was returning to Liverpool from Havana, when she had to put into Dublin in distress. She had been on shore and greatly damaged her cargo, which had to be unloaded to lighten her.
North	United Kingdom	The cutter was driven ashore and wrecked at Fort Ostenburg, Trincomalee, Ceylon in a tempest.
Norwich Packet	United Kingdom	The ship was driven ashore at Flamborough Head, Yorkshire.
HMS Révolutionnaire	Royal Navy	The Seine-class frigate was driven ashore on Long Island, New York, United States.
Rose	United Kingdom	The ship was wrecked near Philadelphia, Pennsylvania, United States. Her crew were rescued.
HMS Sheerness	Royal Navy	The fifth rate was driven ashore and wrecked on York Island, Ceylon in a tempest.
Temple	United Kingdom	War of the Third Coalition: The brig was captured and burnt by the privateers General Perignon and Sorcière (both France).
Thetis	United Kingdom	The ship was driven ashore and damaged. She was on a voyage from King's Lynn to London. Thetis was later refloated and taken in to Grimsby, Lincolnshire.
Thetis	United Kingdom	The ship was driven ashore near Aberdeen. She was on a voyage from Riga to Leith, Lothian.
Two Brothers	United Kingdom	The ship was wrecked on the Fairness Rock, off Margate, Kent. Her crew were rescued. She was on a voyage from Lisbon, Portugal to London.
Union	United Kingdom	HMS Argus ran down and sank Union at Waterford; the crew was saved.
Venus	United Kingdom	The ship ran aground on the North Bull, in the Irish Sea off the coast of County Dublin. She was on a voyage from Waterford to Dublin.
Victory	United Kingdom	The ship was driven ashore at Kilrush, County Clare. She was on a voyage from Limerick to London.
Weymouth	United Kingdom	The ship foundered with the loss of all hands .
Unnamed	Flag unknown	The ship struck rocks and was wrecked at Howick, Northumberland, United Kingdom with the loss of all hands.

== February ==
=== 3 February ===
List of shipwrecks: February 1805
Ship	State	Description
Hope	United Kingdom	War of the Third Coalition: The ship was captured off Berbice by a French privateer. She was plundered and sunk. Hope was on a voyage from Liverpool, Lancashire, to Berbice.
Thetis	United Kingdom	The ship was captured by the privateer Prosper (France). She was subsequently lost off Calais, France.

=== 4 February ===
List of shipwrecks: 4 February 1805
Ship	State	Description
HMS Acheron	Royal Navy	War of the Third Coalition: The sloop-of-war was sunk off Cape Caxine, Algeria, in an engagement with Hortense and Incorruptible (both French Navy).
HMS Arrow	Royal Navy	HMS Arrow, HMS Acheron and the French frigates Hortense and Incorruptible. War of the Third Coalition: The bomb vessel was sunk off Cape Caxine, Algeria, by Hortense and Incorruptible (both French Navy).
Duchess of Rutland	United Kingdom	War of the Third Coalition: The transport ship was captured by Hortense and Incorruptible (both French Navy). She was burnt on 6 February. Duchess of Rutland was on a voyage from Malta to an English port.

=== 5 February ===
List of shipwrecks: 5 February 1805
Ship	State	Description
Earl of Abergavenny	British East India Company	The East Indiaman was wrecked at Weymouth, Dorset, with the loss of 263 of the 402 people on board. She was refloated on 18 July.
Herione	United Kingdom	War of the Third Coalition: The ship was captured and sunk by Hortense (French Navy). She was on a voyage from Smyrna, Ottoman Empire, to London.
Norwich Packet	United Kingdom	The ship was driven ashore near Hartlepool, County Durham. She was on a voyage from Sunderland, County Durham, to Bridlington, Yorkshire.

=== 7 February ===
List of shipwrecks: February 1805
Ship	State	Description
William	United Kingdom	The ship was run down and sunk in the North Sea off Lowestoft, Suffolk. Her crew were rescued. She was on a voyage from Great Yarmouth, Norfolk, to London.

=== 8 February ===
List of shipwrecks: 8 February 1805
Ship	State	Description
Blandford	United Kingdom	The brig was driven ashore and wrecked at Bishopstone, Sussex, with the loss of all hands. She was on a voyage from London to Poole, Dorset.
Endeavour	United Kingdom	The West Indiaman was wrecked on the Goodwin Sands, Kent. Her crew were rescued. She was on a voyage from Jamaica to London.

=== 9 February ===
List of shipwrecks: February 1805
Ship	State	Description
Horatio	United Kingdom	The brig foundered in the North Sea off Flamborough Head, Yorkshire.
Jamaica	United Kingdom	The ship was wrecked near Ambleteuse, Pas-de-Calais, France. Her crew were rescued, but made prisoners. She was on a voyage from Jamaica to London.

=== 10 February ===
List of shipwrecks: 10 February 1805
Ship	State	Description
Cruger	United States	The ship was abandoned at sea. She was on a voyage from Cádiz, Spain to Charleston, South Carolina.

=== 12 February ===
List of shipwrecks: 12 February 1805
Ship	State	Description
Aurora	Spain	The prize ship was driven ashore on the Isle of Mull.
Emilia	United Kingdom	The ship was driven ashore and wrecked on Borkum, Prussia. She was on a voyage from Havre de Grâce, Seine-Inférieure, France to Emden.

=== 14 February ===
List of shipwrecks: 14 February 1805
Ship	State	Description
Colin	United Kingdom	The ship was driven ashore and damaged in the Bristol Channel. She was on a voyage from Bristol, Gloucestershire, to Saint Vincent. Colin was later refloated and put into Bristol for repairs.

=== 16 February ===
List of shipwrecks: February 1805
Ship	State	Description
Susan	United Kingdom	The ship was discovered at sea crewless 12 leagues (36 nautical miles (67 km)) south of Cork by HMS Argus (Royal Navy). She was taken in tow but sank near the Harbour Rock,

=== 20 February ===
List of shipwrecks: 20 February 1805
Ship	State	Description
Fortune	United Kingdom	The ship foundered off Kirkcudbright with the loss of all hands. She was on a voyage from an Irish port to Workington, Cumberland.

=== 23 February ===
List of shipwrecks: 23 February 1805
Ship	State	Description
Unnamed	Unknown, but British	The 12-gun brig was wrecked between Wimereux and Wimille, Pas-de-Calais, France. Her 60 crew were rescued.

=== 25 February ===
List of shipwrecks: 25 February 1805
Ship	State	Description
Eendragt	Prussia	The ship was driven ashore near Boulogne, Pas-de-Calais, France and wrecked. She was on a voyage from Bordeaux, Basses-Pyrénées to Antwerp, Deux-Nèthes, France.

=== 26 February ===
List of shipwrecks: 26 February 1805
Ship	State	Description
HMS Redbridge	Royal Navy	The schooner sprang a leak and sank without loss of life in Pedro Bay off the coast of Jamaica.

=== 27 February ===
List of shipwrecks: 27 February 1805
Ship	State	Description
Fame	United Kingdom	The ship was driven ashore and wrecked in the Clyde. She was on a voyage from Greenock, Renfrewshire, to Trinidad.

=== Unknown date ===
List of shipwrecks: Unknown date in February 1805
Ship	State	Description
Bannister	United Kingdom	The ship was driven ashore at Sunderland, County Durham. She was on a voyage from Sunderland to London.
Britannia	United Kingdom	The ship was driven ashore and wrecked on Holy Island, Anglesey. She was on a voyage from Waterford to Liverpool, Lancashire.
Cassador de Lisboa	Portugal	The ship foundered off Figueira da Foz while on a voyage from Figueira da Foz to Liverpool.
City of Edinburgh	United Kingdom	The ship was driven ashore and severely damaged at Margate, Kent. She was on a voyage from London to Antigua.
Commerce	United Kingdom	The ship was driven ashore and wrecked at Cloughton, Yorkshire. Her crew were rescued. She was on a voyage from Dundee, Forfarshire, to London.
Craven	United Kingdom	The sloop was wrecked off Cádiz, Spain. Her crew survived but were taken prisoner by the Spanish.
Diana	United Kingdom	The ship was wrecked on the coast of Scotland. She was on a voyage from Liverpool to Africa.
Duchess of York	United Kingdom	The ship was driven ashore whilst on a voyage from Carron, Stirlingshire to London. She was later refloated and put into Lindisfarne, Northumberland.
Elizabeth	United Kingdom	The ship was driven ashore and wrecked at Tynemouth, Northumberland.
Elizabeth	United Kingdom	The ship was lost whilst on a voyage from Livorno, Grand Duchy of Tuscany to Leith, Lothian. Her crew were rescued.
Elizabeth	United Kingdom	The ship was lost near Wexford with the loss of all hands. She was on a voyage from Wexford to Dublin.
Enterprize	(flag) United States	The ship was driven ashore and wrecked near Bristol, Gloucestershire, United Kingdom. She was on a voyage from Baltimore, Maryland, to Bristol.
Gorgus	Flag unknown	The ship foundered. Her crew were rescued by Anna Catha (United Kingdom). Gorgus was on a voyage from Liverpool to Lisbon, Portugal.
Helena	United Kingdom	The ship was driven ashore at Hartlepool, County Durham. She was on a voyage from Quebec City, Lower Canada, British North America to Newcastle upon Tyne, Northumberland.Helena was later refloated and taken in to Hartlepool.
Industry	United States	The ship capsized in the Atlantic Ocean. Her crew were rescued by New Century (United States). Industry was on a voyage from Massachusetts to Montserrat.
Jane	United Kingdom	The schooner was lost at Madeira.
John	United Kingdom	The ship struck rocks at the Isle of Mull and sank. She was on a voyage from Sligo to Liverpool.
Mary	United Kingdom	The ship was driven ashore in the River Severn or the River Mersey. She was on a voyage from Ross-on-Wye, Herefordshire to Liverpool.
Peggy	United Kingdom	The ship was lost off the Mull of Galloway, Ayrshire. Her crew were rescued. She was on a voyage from Liverpool to Sligo.
Providence	United Kingdom	The ship was driven ashore and wrecked at Margate, Kent. She was on a voyage from South Shields, County Durham, to Margate.
Rochdale	United Kingdom	The ship was driven ashore and damaged at Lowestoft, Suffolk. She was on a voyage from Hull, Yorkshire to London. Rochdale was later refloated and taken in to Great Yarmouth, Norfolk, for repairs.
HMS Seagull	Royal Navy	The Diligence-class brig-sloop foundered in the English Channel with the loss of all hands.
Three Williams	United Kingdom	The ship was driven ashore at Tynemouth. She was on a voyage from London to Newcastle upon Tyne, Northumberland. Three Williams was later refloated.
Vigilance	United Kingdom	The ship was lost near Wexford with the loss of all hands. She was on a voyage from Wexford to Liverpool.
Vrow Margaretha	Flag unknown	The ship was lost at Vigo, Spain. She was on a voyage from Cork, United Kingdom to Lisbon.
Unnamed	France	The ship was driven ashore and wrecked at Ajaccio, Corsica on or before 19 February.

== March ==
=== 1 March ===
List of shipwrecks: March 1805
Ship	State	Description
Bellona	United Kingdom	The ship departed from New York City, United States for Galway. No further trace, presumed foundered in the Atlantic Ocean with the loss of all hands.
Caminhando	Portugal	The brig was driven ashore and wrecked near Barmouth, Caernarvonshire, United Kingdom.

=== 2 March ===
List of shipwrecks: March 1805
Ship	State	Description
Arno	United Kingdom	The ship was wrecked near Hartlepool, County Durham with the loss of all hands.
Aurora	United Kingdom	The ship was driven ashore in the River Mersey near the King's Dock Basin, Liverpool, Lancashire. She was on a voyage from Saint Kitts to Liverpool. She was later refloated.
Britannia	United Kingdom	The ship was driven ashore in the River Mersey. She was later refloated.
George Washington	United States	The ship was driven ashore at Hoylake, Cheshire, United Kingdom. She was on a voyage from Savannah, Georgia, to Liverpool.
Golden Age	United States	The ship was driven ashore at Hoylake. She was on a voyage from Charleston, South Carolina, to Liverpool.
Hardware	United Kingdom	The ship was driven ashore in the River Mersey. She was on a voyage from New York, United States to Liverpool. She was later refloated.
Orwell	United Kingdom	The ship was driven ashore and severely damaged in the River Mersey. She was later refloated.
Susannah	United Kingdom	The ship was driven ashore in the River Mersey near the King's Dock, Liverpool. She was on a voyage from New Orleans, Louisiana District, to Liverpool.

=== 5 March ===
List of shipwrecks: 5 March 1805
Ship	State	Description
Flora	Stettin	The ship was wrecked on Heligoland with the loss of a crew member. She was on a voyage from Stettin to Hamburg.

=== 6 March ===
List of shipwrecks: 6 March 1805
Ship	State	Description
Eclipse	United Kingdom	War of the Third Coalition: The sloop was burnt at Saint Kitts in an attack by Actæon, Armede, Gloire, Infatigable, Jemmapes, Lion, Lynx and Magnanime (all French Navy).
Lady Nelson	United Kingdom	War of the Third Coalition: The ship was burnt at Saint Kitts in an attack by Actæon, Armede, Gloire, Infatigable, Jemmapes, Lion, Lynx and Magnanime (all French Navy).
Matthew	United Kingdom	War of the Third Coalition: The ship was burnt at Saint Kitts in an attack by Actæon, Armede, Gloire, Infatigable, Jemmapes, Lion, Lynx and Magnanime (all French Navy).
Ossippec	(United Kingdom of Great Britain and Ireland) Saint Kitts	War of the Third Coalition: The ship was burnt at Saint Kitts by a French squadron.
Thetis	United Kingdom	War of the Third Coalition: The ship was burnt at Saint Kitts in an attack by Actæon, Armede, Gloire, Infatigable, Jemmapes, Lion, Lynx and Magnanime (all French Navy).
Thomas	United Kingdom	War of the Third Coalition: The ship was burnt at Saint Kitts in an attack by Actæon, Armede, Gloire, Infatigable, Jemmapes, Lion, Lynx and Magnanime (all French Navy).

=== 7 March ===
List of shipwrecks: 7 March 1805
Ship	State	Description
Lady Jane Halliday	United Kingdom	War of the Third Coalition: The brig was burnt at Nevis in an attack by Actæon, Armede, Gloire, Infatigable, Jemmapes, Lion, Lynx and Magnanime (all French Navy).
Nelly	United Kingdom	War of the Third Coalition: The brig was burnt at Nevis in an attack by Actæon, Armede, Gloire, Infatigable, Jemmapes, Lion, Lynx and Magnanime (all French Navy).
Themis	United Kingdom	War of the Third Coalition: The brig was burnt at Nevis in an attack by Actæon, Armede, Gloire, Infatigable, Jemmapes, Lion, Lynx and Magnanime (all French Navy).
Twins	United Kingdom	War of the Third Coalition: The ship was burnt at Nevis by a French squadron.

=== 8 March ===
List of shipwrecks: 8 March 1805
Ship	State	Description
Concord	United States	The ship was wrecked in the Florida Keys.
HMS Fly	Royal Navy	The sloop-of-war was wrecked in the Florida Keys.
Rattler	United Kingdom	The ship was wrecked on the Carysfort Reef, in the Gulf of Florida. She was on a voyage from British Honduras to London.

=== 9 March ===
List of shipwrecks: 12 March 1805
Ship	State	Description
Hamilton	United Kingdom	War of the Third Coalition: The ship was burnt at Montserrat by a French squadron.
Liberty	United Kingdom	War of the Third Coalition: The ship was burnt at Montserrat by a French squadron.
Sarah	United Kingdom	War of the Third Coalition: The ship was burnt at Montserrat by a French squadron.

=== 12 March ===
List of shipwrecks: 12 March 1805
Ship	State	Description
HMS Imogen	Royal Navy	The sloop-of-war sprang a leak and foundered in the Atlantic Ocean off the Outer Hebrides while escorting a convoy from Jamaica to London. Her crew were rescued by Lord Forbes (United Kingdom) and other ships.

=== 16 March ===
List of shipwrecks: 16 March 1805
Ship	State	Description
Blanche	United Kingdom	The ship departed from the Clyde for Halifax, Nova Scotia, British North America. No further trace, presumed foundered in the Atlantic Ocean with the loss of all hands.

=== 19 March ===
List of shipwrecks: 19 March 1805
Ship	State	Description
Dreadnought	United Kingdom	The ship was driven ashore and severely damaged at Milford, Pembrokeshire. She was on a voyage from London to São Miguel Island, Azores.

=== 21 March ===
List of shipwrecks: 21 March 1805
Ship	State	Description
Francis	United Kingdom	The schooner was wrecked off the mouth of the Hunter River, New South Wales.

=== 23 March ===
List of shipwrecks: 23 March 1805
Ship	State	Description
Good Design	United Kingdom	The ship was driven ashore on the coast of the Isle of Man and was wrecked. Her crew were rescued. She was on a voyage from Liverpool, Lancashire, to Riga, Russia.

=== 29 March ===
List of shipwrecks: 29 March 1805
Ship	State	Description
John and Mary	United Kingdom	The sloop struck the Whitby Rock. She was on a voyage from Dundee, Forfarshire to London. She put in to Whitby, Yorkshire.
Leviamento Falcao	Portugal	The ship was driven ashore near Pwllheli, Caernarvonshire, United Kingdom. She was on a voyage from Lisbon to Liverpool, Lancashire, United Kingdom.
Triad	United Kingdom	The ship struck the Whitby Rock and was damaged. She put in to Whitby.

=== 30 March ===
List of shipwrecks: 30 March 1805
Ship	State	Description
Alexander	United Kingdom	The ship foundered in the North Sea with the loss of all hands. She was on a voyage from Liverpool, Lancashire, to Helsingør, Denmark.

=== 31 March ===
List of shipwrecks: 31 March 1805
Ship	State	Description
British Queen	United Kingdom	The ship struck a rock at South Shields, County Durham, and was wrecked. Her crew were rescued.
Northumberland	United Kingdom	The ship was wrecked on Scroby Sands, in the North Sea off the coast of Norfolk. Her crew were rescued.
Sarah	United Kingdom	The brig was wrecked on the Whitton Sand, in the Humber upstream of Barton-upon-Humber, Lincolnshire. Her crew were rescued.
Unity	United Kingdom	The ship was driven ashore at Jack-in-the-Basket, Blyth, Northumberland.

=== Unknown date ===
List of shipwrecks: Unknown date in March 1805
Ship	State	Description
Adventure	United Kingdom	The ship lost her rudder while on a voyage from Malta to London. She was set afire and abandoned in the Mediterranean Sea.
Alexander	Russia	The ship was wrecked on the Dutch coast while on a voyage from Saint Petersburg to Bordeaux, Basses-Pyrénées.
Anna	United Kingdom	The ship was wrecked at Hartlepool, County Durham.
Arbuckle	United Kingdom	The ship was wrecked in Rocky Cove, County Cork. She was on a voyage from Whitehaven, Cumberland, to Cork and the West Indies.
Aurora	United Kingdom	The ship was lost at Gibraltar. Her crew were rescued.
Aurora	United Kingdom	War of the Third Coalition: The ship was burnt at Dominica by the French.
Bridget	United Kingdom	The ship was captured in the Mediterranean Sea while on a voyage from Zant, Septinsular Republic to London. She was set afire and sunk.
Cupid	United Kingdom	The ship was wrecked on the Pan Sand, in the North Sea off Margate, Kent.
Dublin	United Kingdom	The brig was wrecked on Lindisfarne, Northumberland. She was on a voyage from Leith, Lothian, to Newcastle upon Tyne, Northumberland.
Ebenezer	United Kingdom	The ship was driven ashore near Ballyshannon, County Donegal. She was on a voyage from Christiansand, Norway to Ballyshannon.
Harmony	United Kingdom	The ship was driven ashore on the west coast of the Isle of Wight. She was on a voyage from Bristol, Gloucestershire, to London. Harmony was later refloated and put into Cowes, Isle of Wight for repairs.
John Morgan	United Kingdom	The ship was driven ashore at the Red Noses, Liverpool, Lancashire and was severely damaged. She was on a voyage from Liverpool to New York, United States. John Morgan was later refloated.
Kent	United Kingdom	The ship was abandoned in the North Sea. She was on a voyage from London to South Shields, County Durham.
Laurel	United Kingdom	The ship was wrecked on the Mull of Galloway, Ayrshire. Her crew were rescued. She was on a voyage from Liverpool to Greenock, Renfrewshire.
Martha	United Kingdom	The sloop was damaged at sea and was beached in the Isles of Scilly.
New Kerrison	United Kingdom	The ship was wrecked on the French coast. Her crew were rescued, but made prisoners. She was on a voyage from Cork to London.
Newland	United Kingdom	War of the Third Coalition: The ship was captured and sunk in the North Sea by the privateer Le Sylphe (France).
North Star	United Kingdom	The ship was driven ashore at Holyhead, Anglesey. She was on a voyage from Liverpool to Berbice. North Star was later refloated and taken in to Holyhead.
Patrick and John	United Kingdom	The ship foundered. Her crew were rescued.
Ruby	United Kingdom	The ship capsized in the Bristol Channel. She was on a voyage from Biddeford, Devon to Bristol, Gloucestershire.
Sally	United Kingdom	The ship was abandoned in the Bay of Roses.
Stranger	United Kingdom	The ship was driven ashore and wrecked at Flamborough Head, Yorkshire. She was on a voyage from Gainsborough, Lincolnshire, to Whitby, North Riding of Yorkshire.
Tentacao	Portugal	The ship was driven ashore near Dublin, United Kingdom.
Tweed	United Kingdom	The ship foundered in the North Sea off Southwold, Suffolk on or before 25 March with the loss of all hands.
Tweed	United Kingdom	The brig was wrecked on the Goodwin Sands, Kent. Her crew took to the boats; they landed on the French coast.
Union	United Kingdom	The ship foundered while on a voyage from Naples, Kingdom of Sicily to Jersey, Channel Islands.
William & Jane	United Kingdom	The ship was wrecked at The Rosses, County Donegal. She was on a voyage from New York to Belfast, County Antrim.

== April ==
=== 1 April ===
List of shipwrecks: 1 April 1805
Ship	State	Description
Queen Charlotte	United Kingdom	The ship was destroyed by fire off Dungeness, Kent. Her crew were rescued. She was on a voyage from Surinam to London.

=== 3 April ===
List of shipwrecks: 3 April 1805
Ship	State	Description
Unnamed	United Kingdom	The sloop was holed by an anchor and sank at Hull, Yorkshire. She was on a voyage from Selby to Hull.

=== 5 April ===
List of shipwrecks: 5 April 1805
Ship	State	Description
HM Hired armed brig Lord Melville	Royal Navy	The brig capsized at Leith, Lothian. Her crew were rescued.

=== 6 April ===
List of shipwrecks: 6 April 1805
Ship	State	Description
Jupiter	United States	The trading brig, Captain Richard Law, hit an iceberg at midnight off the southeast coast of Newfoundland, after getting trapped in an icefield, and sank in half an hour. Twenty-seven of the total of 73 persons on board the trading ship went down with the ship and drowned. The 15 crew and 31 other passengers survived by taking to a long boat and yawl. During the next several days, they were rescued and divided among several fishing ships. In some cases, because of the fishing ships' schedules, the survivors did not reach Marblehead and Salem, Massachusetts for weeks. Based in New York City, Jupiter was on a voyage from London, Great Britain to New York.

=== 9 April ===
List of shipwrecks: 9 April 1805
Ship	State	Description
San Rafael	Spanish Navy	The ship of the line ran aground at Cádiz.

=== 14 April ===
List of shipwrecks: 14 April 1805
Ship	State	Description
Jane	United Kingdom	War of the Third Coalition: The ship was captured and sunk by the privateer Sylphe (France). She was on a voyage from London to Quebec City, Lower Canada, British North America.

=== 18 April ===
List of shipwrecks: 18 April 1805
Ship	State	Description
Nancy	(United Kingdom of Great Britain and Ireland) New South Wales	The sloop foundered in Jervis Bay with the loss of a crew member.

=== 23 April ===
List of shipwrecks: 18 April 1805
Ship	State	Description
Sally	United States	The ship was sunk by ice with the loss of all but six of her crew. She was on a voyage from Charleston, South Carolina, to Liverpool, Lancashire, United Kingdom.

=== 24 April ===
List of shipwrecks: 24 April 1805
Ship	State	Description
William	United Kingdom	War of the Third Coalition: The ship was captured and sunk by the privateer L'Hirondelle (France). She was on a voyage from Newcastle upon Tyne, Northumberland to Varel, Prussia.

=== 25 April ===
List of shipwrecks: 25 April 1805
Ship	State	Description
Nymph	United Kingdom	The brigantine was crushed by ice off the Domesness Reef in the Baltic Sea and foundered with the loss of all hands.

=== 27 April ===
List of shipwrecks: 27 April 1805
Ship	State	Description
HMS Egyptienne	Royal Navy	The Forte-class frigate ran aground on The Shingles, Isle of Wight. She was on a voyage from Lisbon Portugal to Portsmouth, Hampshire She was refloated and taken in to Portsmouth.
Favourite	United Kingdom	The ship was driven ashore on Fair Isle and wrecked. Her crew were rescued.

=== 29 April ===
List of shipwrecks: 29 April 1805
Ship	State	Description
Draper	United Kingdom	The ship was driven ashore on the Welsh coast. She was on a voyage from Liverpool, Lancashire, to Waterford.

=== Unknown date ===
List of shipwrecks: Unknown date in April 1805
Ship	State	Description
Betsey	United Kingdom	The ship was lost whilst on a voyage from Waterford to Hull, Yorkshire.
HMS Bouncer	Royal Navy	War of the Third Coalition: The gun-brig ran aground in the English Channel off Dieppe, Seine-Inférieure, France and was wrecked. Her crew survived but were taken prisoner by the French .
Britannia	United Kingdom	The collier, a brig, collided with another ship in the North Sea 4 leagues (12 nautical miles (22 km)) off Spurn Point, Yorkshire and foundered with the loss of two of her crew.
Calpe	United Kingdom	The ship was driven ashore and wrecked in the Dardanelles. She was on a voyage from London to Constantinople, Ottoman Empire.
Esther	United Kingdom	The ship foundered in the Atlantic Ocean while on a voyage from New York, United States to London/ Her crew were rescued.
Expedition	United Kingdom	The ship foundered off South Shields, County Durham.
Guardian	United Kingdom	The ship was lost near Cork. She was on a voyage from New York to Dublin.
Howe	United Kingdom	The ship struck the Runnel Stone and was severely damaged. She subsequently put into Penzance, Cornwall.
Little Sisters	United Kingdom	The ship was wrecked on the Wicklow Banks, in the Irish Sea. She was on a voyage from Bristol, Gloucestershire, to Newfoundland, British North America.
Minerva	United Kingdom	The ship was driven ashore and wrecked near King's Lynn, Norfolk. She was on a voyage from Danzig, Prussia, to London.
Nancy & Peggy	United Kingdom	The ship was driven ashore near Holyhead, Anglesey. She was on a voyage from Dublin to Liverpool, Lancashire.
Neptune	United Kingdom	The ship sank off Fife Ness.
Realisation	United Kingdom	The ship was driven ashore and wrecked near Brightlingsea, Essex. She was on a voyage from Stockholm, Sweden to Galway.
Robert	United Kingdom	The ship was wrecked in Crabbs Bay while on a voyage from Cork to Galway.
Scarborough	United Kingdom	The ship sprang a leak and foundered off Port Royal, Jamaica with the loss of seven of her crew.
Swan	United Kingdom	The ship was driven ashore near Sheerness, Kent.
17 unnamed vessels	French Navy	The ships were driven ashore and wrecked north east of Boulogne, Pas-de-Calais. Fifteen of them were broken up.

== May ==
=== 1 May ===
List of shipwrecks: 1 May 1805
Ship	State	Description
Maria	Prussia	The ship foundered in the Atlantic Ocean off Ouessant, Finistère, France. She was on a voyage from Málaga, Spain to Emden.

=== 9 May ===
List of shipwrecks: 9 May 1805
Ship	State	Description
Charles Hamilton	United Kingdom	The ship was driven ashore and wrecked at Tönning.
Lord Duncan	United Kingdom	The ship was driven ashore and wrecked at Tönning.

=== 10 May ===
List of shipwrecks: 10 May 1805
Ship	State	Description
Industry	United Kingdom	The ship foundered off the Orkney Islands. Her crew were rescued. She was on a voyage from Dublin to Galway.

=== 14 May ===
List of shipwrecks: 17 May 1805
Ship	State	Description
Minerva	United Kingdom	The ship capsized at Falmouth, Jamaica.

=== 17 May ===
List of shipwrecks: 17 May 1805
Ship	State	Description
Charlotte	United Kingdom	The ship was driven ashore in the Eyder. She was later refloated.

=== 21 May ===
List of shipwrecks: 21 May 1805
Ship	State	Description
Providence	United Kingdom	The ship ran aground on the Sandhammer Reef, in the Baltic Sea. She was on a voyage from Great Yarmouth, Norfolk, to Libava, Courland Governorate.

=== 29 May ===
List of shipwrecks: 29 May 1805
Ship	State	Description
Esther Lindo	United Kingdom	The ship foundered in the Atlantic Ocean (41°55′N 41°25′W). Her crew were rescued by Maria Elizabeth (Hamburg). Esther Lindo was on a voyage from New York, United States to London.

=== Unknown date ===
List of shipwrecks: Unknown date in May 1805
Ship	State	Description
Active	United Kingdom	The brig was driven ashore at Deal, Kent, and was wrecked.
Active	United Kingdom	The ship sprang a leak in the English Channel and was beached at Portland, Dorset. She was later refloated and taken in to Weymouth, Dorset.
Alcmene	Royal Navy	The Alcmene-class frigate ran ashore. She was refloated and taken in to Portsmouth, Hampshire in a leaky condition and placed under repair.
Betsey	United Kingdom	The ship foundered in the Irish Sea off Holyhead, Anglesey. Barratry by either the captain or the mate was the cause. She was on a voyage from Liverpool, Lancashire, to Dublin.
Betsey	United Kingdom	The ship was lost near Broadstairs, Kent.
Elizabeth	United Kingdom	The ship caught fire at Gibraltar and was scuttled. She was on a voyage from Malta to Leith, Lothian.
Emilia	Lübeck	The ship was driven ashore and wrecked on Ameland, Friesland, Batavian Republic. She was on a voyage from Lübeck to Ferrol, Spain.
Esther	United Kingdom	The ship foundered in the Atlantic Ocean. Her crew were rescued. She was on a voyage from New York, United States to London.
Fame	United Kingdom	The ship was lost at St Lucar, Spain. She was on a voyage from Rotterdam, South Holland, Batavian Republic to St Lucar.
Favourite	United Kingdom	The ship was wrecked on the Herd Sand, in the North Sea off South Shields, County Durham.
Standhastigkeit	Prussia	The ship was driven ashore at Dragø, Denmark. She was on a voyage from Memel to Dublin.
Susan & Polly	United Kingdom	The ship was driven ashore and wrecked near Chichester, Sussex. She was on a voyage from Tenerife, Spain to London.

== June ==
=== 5 June ===
List of shipwrecks: 5 June 1805
Ship	State	Description
Duke of Clarence	United Kingdom	The whaler foundered in the River Plate with the loss of a crew member. She was on a voyage from Liverpool, Lancashire, to the South Seas.
Young Eagle	United Kingdom	The sloop ran aground and sank east of Inchkeith, Fife. She was on a voyage from Leith, Lothian to Wick, Caithness. She was refloated and taken in to Leith.

=== 11 June ===
List of shipwrecks: 22 June 1805
Ship	State	Description
Agnes	United Kingdom	The sloop was damaged by fire at Perth.
Milbank	United Kingdom	The ship was driven ashore near Visby, Gotland, Sweden. She was on a voyage from Riga, Russia to London. She was refloated and taken in to Visby for repairs.

=== 15 June ===
List of shipwrecks: 15 June 1805
Ship	State	Description
Farmer	United Kingdom	The ship ran aground in the River Tyne and was damaged. She was refloated and placed under repair.

=== 22 June ===
List of shipwrecks: 22 June 1805
Ship	State	Description
Fanny	United Kingdom	The ship ran aground on Skysea and was wrecked. Her cew survived. She was on a voyage from Neath, Glamorgan, to Cork.

=== 24 June ===
List of shipwrecks: 24 June 1805
Ship	State	Description
No. 5	Imperial Russian Navy	Russo-Persian War: The galiot ran aground and was wrecked at Bandar-e Anzali, Persia, while landing troops.

=== 30 June ===
List of shipwrecks: 30 June 1805
Ship	State	Description
Jamaica	United Kingdom	The ship was wrecked at John's Point, Jamaica. She was on a voyage from Jamaica to London.
Mercury	United Kingdom	The ship departed Jamaica to join a convoy bound for Liverpool, Lancashire. No further trace, presumed foundered with the loss of all hands.

=== Unknown date ===
List of shipwrecks: Unknown date in June 1805
Ship	State	Description
USS Gunboat No. 7	United States Navy	The gunboat disappeared after departing New York City, on 20 June 1805 bound for the Mediterranean Sea.
HMCS Integrity	Royal Navy	The cutter departed Sydney, New South Wales for Valparaíso. No further trace, presumed foundered with the loss of all hands.
Ontario	United Kingdom	The ship was wrecked at Liverpool, Lancashire while bound for New York, United States.

== July ==
=== 7 July ===
List of shipwrecks: 7 July 1805
Ship	State	Description
Nancy	United States	The ship was captured off Cape Corantes by a French privateer. She was driven ashore and burnt. Nancy was on a voyage from Jamaica to New York.

=== 11 July ===
List of shipwrecks: 1 July 1805
Ship	State	Description
HMS Orestes	Royal Navy	War of the Third Coalition: The brig-sloop was wrecked on the Splitter Sands in the North Sea off Gravelines, France. Her burned her to prevent her capture by the French.
Sarah	United Kingdom	War of the Third Coalition: The captain deliberately wrecked the ship north off Point de Galle, Ceylon, to avoid capture.

=== 12 July ===
List of shipwrecks: 12 July 1805
Ship	State	Description
John Edward	United Kingdom	The ship was driven ashore and wrecked on Ameland, Friesland, Batavian Republic. She was on a voyage from Memel, Prussia to Plymouth, Devon.

=== 29 July ===
List of shipwrecks: 29 July 1804
Ship	State	Description
Snow Packet	United Kingdom	The ship ran aground on "St. Cuba Island" and was abandoned by her crew. She was on a voyage from Jamaica to London.

=== 31 July ===
List of shipwrecks: 31 July 1805
Ship	State	Description
St. John Sebastianẹ	United Kingdom	The ship was lost at Timor.

=== Unknown date ===
List of shipwrecks: Unknown date in July 1805
Ship	State	Description
Atlas	United Kingdom	The ship was driven ashore and wrecked in the Orkney Islands.
HMS Blanche	Royal Navy	War of the Third Coalition: The fifth-rate was captured after an engagement with Départment des Landes, Faune, Topaze and Torche (all French Navy). She was set afire and sunk. Survivors were rescued by Topaze.
Carl August	Duchy of Holstein	The ship was driven ashore near Dungeness, Kent, United Kingdom. She was on a voyage from Liverpool, Lancashire, United Kingdom to Tönningen.
Conceicao	Spain	The ship was wrecked near Ayamonte. She was on a voyage from Norfolk, Virginia, United States to Cádiz.
Fanny	United Kingdom	The ship foundered in the Irish Sea while on a voyage from Liverpool, Lancashire to Cork.
Julia	United Kingdom	The ship sank at the King's Dock, Liverpool.

== August ==
=== 1 August ===
List of shipwrecks: 1 August 1805
Ship	State	Description
Harmony	United Kingdom	The ship was driven ashore on Møn, Denmark. She was on a voyage from Memel, Prussia to Hull, Yorkshire.

=== 6 August ===
List of shipwrecks: 6 August 1805
Ship	State	Description
Fame	United Kingdom	The ship was driven ashore at Londonderry and was wrecked.
Génois	France	The Téméraire-class ship of the line was damaged in an accident on being launched at Genoa, Ligurian Republic and became hogged. She was repaired and successfully launched on 16 August.
Rose	United Kingdom	The ship was wrecked on the Hoyle Bank, in Liverpool Bay. She was on a voyage from Liverpool, Lancashire, to Philadelphia, Pennsylvania, United States.

=== 7 August ===
List of shipwrecks: 7 August 1805
Ship	State	Description
Prince of Wales	United Kingdom	The ship capsized and was wrecked at Hull, Yorkshire. She was on a voyage from Memel, Prussia to Hull.

=== 10 August ===
List of shipwrecks: 9 August 1805
Ship	State	Description
HMS Pigmy	Royal Navy	The Mutin-class cutter was wrecked in St Aubin's Bay, Jersey, Channel Islands. Her crew were rescued by HMS Albacore, HMS Alcmene, HMS Conquest and HMS Eclipse (all Royal Navy).

=== 12 August ===
List of shipwrecks: 12 August 1805
Ship	State	Description
6 unnamed vessels	French Navy	The schooners were driven ashore and wrecked on the coast of Pas-de-Calais.

=== 14 August ===
List of shipwrecks: 14 August 1805
Ship	State	Description
Four unnamed vessels	French Navy	War of the Third Coalition: Three ships were severely damaged and one was sunk in the English Channel off Boulogne, Pas-de-Calais in an action with HMS Diligence (Royal Navy).

=== 15 August ===
List of shipwrecks: 15 August 1805
Ship	State	Description
Barbara	United Kingdom	War of the Third Coalition: The ship was captured and burnt by French and Spanish Navy ships. She was on a voyage from Porto, Portugal to Leith, Lothian.
Gravina	United Kingdom	War of the Third Coalition: The ship was captured and burnt by French and Spanish Navy ships. She was on a voyage from Malta to London.

=== 16 August ===
List of shipwrecks: 16 August 1805
Ship	State	Description
Successful Nancy	United Kingdom	The ship was wrecked on Sandy Island, Antigua. She was on a voyage from Antigua to Liverpool, Lancashire.

=== 17 August ===
List of shipwrecks: 17 August 1805
Ship	State	Description
Fama de Sur	United Kingdom	The ship was captured off Cape St. Vincent, Portugal by French and Spanish Navy vessels while on a voyage from Gibraltar to Lisbon, Portugal. She was set afire and sunk.
Maria Cornelia	United Kingdom	The ship was captured off Cape St. Vincent by French and Spanish Navy vessels while on a voyage from Gibraltar to Lisbon. She was set afire and sunk.

=== 25 August ===
List of shipwrecks: 25 August 1805
Ship	State	Description
Two Friends	United Kingdom	The ship was destroyed by fire at Surinam.

=== 29 August ===
List of shipwrecks: 29 August 1805
Ship	State	Description
Leopard	(United Kingdom of Great Britain and Ireland) British North America	The ship capsized in the Atlantic Ocean (approximately 32°N 51°W). Her crew were rescued by Royal Charlotte (United Kingdom).

=== Unknown date ===
List of shipwrecks: Unknown date in August 1805
Ship	State	Description
Bolina	United Kingdom	The ship was lost in the Humber. She was on a voyage from Riga, Russia to Hull, Yorkshire.
Euphan	United Kingdom	The ship was lost in the Eyder.
Ganges	United Kingdom	The ship foundered while on a voyage from Tortola to the United Kingdom.
John	United Kingdom	The ship ran aground off Penzance, Cornwall. She was refloated and put into Falmouth, Cornwall. John was on a voyage from Swansea, Glamorgan, to Truro, Cornwall.
Minerva	United Kingdom	The ship was taken off Lima after her crew had mutinied in mid-August; the crew became prisoners in Peru. When the crew mutinied they had put two officers in a boat who were rescued after seven days by Maria (United States). They also put 10 crew men in two boats, one of which reached land and the other of which Port au Prince rescued (United Kingdom).
Richard	United Kingdom	The ship was driven ashore near Rye, Sussex. She was on a voyage from London to Gibraltar. Richarrd was later refloated.

== September ==
=== 3 September ===
List of shipwrecks: 3 September 1805
Ship	State	Description
Catharine	United Kingdom	The ship foundered in the Atlantic Ocean while on a voyage from the Leeward Islands to the United Kingdom.
Montreal	United Kingdom	The ship foundered in the Atlantic Ocean while on a voyage from the Leeward Islands to the United Kingdom.

=== 5 September ===
List of shipwrecks: 5 September 1805
Ship	State	Description
Catherine	United Kingdom	The ship foundered in the Atlantic Ocean while on a voyage from Surinam to London. Her crew were rescued.
Magdelina	United Kingdom	The ship foundered in the Atlantic Ocean while on a voyage from Surinam to London. Her crew were rescued .
Union	United Kingdom	The ship foundered in the Atlantic Ocean while on a voyage from Grenada to the Clyde. Her crew were rescued.

=== 6 September ===
List of shipwrecks: 6 September 1804
Ship	State	Description
Catherine	United Kingdom	The ship foundered with the loss of all but three of her crew. She was on a voyage from Surinam to London.
Goldfinch	United Kingdom	The ship foundered. She was on a voyage from Tobago to London.
Magdalene	United Kingdom	The ship foundered. She was on a voyage from Tobago to the Clyde.
Union	United Kingdom	The ship foundered. She was on a voyage from Tobago to London.
Unnamed vessels	United Kingdom	Two or three ships foundered. They were on voyages from Tobago to the United Kingdom.

=== 7 September ===
List of shipwrecks: 7 September 1805
Ship	State	Description
Adventure	United States	The ship was wrecked at Cape Henry, Virginia. She was on a voyage from Jamaica to Virginia.
HMS Diligentia	Royal Navy	The ship was wrecked in Mill Bay, Plymouth, Devon with the loss of all hands.
William	United Kingdom	The brig foundered at sea.

=== 8 September ===
List of shipwrecks: 8 September 1805
Ship	State	Description
Octavia	United States	The ship caught fire at Madeira and was scuttled.

=== 10 September ===
List of shipwrecks: 10 September 1805
Ship	State	Description
Lord Nelson	United Kingdom	The brig was abandoned off the Orkney Islands.

=== 12 September ===
List of shipwrecks: 12 September 1805
Ship	State	Description
Boddington	United Kingdom	The West Indiaman ran aground in the River Thames at Blackwall, Middlesex and was wrecked. She was on a voyage from Jamaica to London.

=== 16 September ===
List of shipwrecks: 16 September 1805
Ship	State	Description
Fame	United Kingdom	The ship was driven ashore in Swine Bottoms, Denmark. She was on a voyage from Riga, Russia to Hull, Yorkshire. Fame was later refloated.
Lucy & Nancy	United Kingdom	The ship was wrecked on the Wicklow Bank in the Irish Sea. She was on a voyage from Liverpool to Virginia, United States.

=== 17 September ===
List of shipwrecks: 17 September 1805
Ship	State	Description
Providence	Spain	The ship was wrecked on the Florida Reef. She was on a voyage from New Orleans, Louisiana Territory, to Bordeaux, Basses-Pyrénées, France.

=== 18 September ===
List of shipwrecks: 18 September 1805
Ship	State	Description
Brunswick	British East India Company	War of the Third Coalition: The East Indiaman, which had been captured by Marengo and Belle Poule (both French Navy) on 11 July, was driven ashore and wrecked at the Cape of Good Hope.

=== 19 September ===
List of shipwrecks: 19 September 1805
Ship	State	Description
Betsey	United Kingdom	The ship was driven ashore in Dunworldly Bay, Ireland. She was on a voyage from Saint Thomas, Virgin Islands to Liverpool, Lancashire. Betsey was refloated on 23 September and put into Kinsale, County Cork.

=== 21 September ===
List of shipwrecks: 21 September 1805
Ship	State	Description
Brothers	United Kingdom	The ship was lost at Arkhangelsk, Russia. She was on a voyage from Arhchangelsk to London.

=== 23 September ===
List of shipwrecks: 23 September 1805
Ship	State	Description
Maria	United Kingdom	The ship was lost in Swindemünde Bay. She was on a voyage from Memel, Prussia to Newcastle upon Tyne, Northumberland.

=== 25 September ===
List of shipwrecks: 25 September 1805
Ship	State	Description
Bloom	United States	The ship foundered in the Atlantic Ocean with the loss of two of her crew. She was on a voyage from Delaware, United States to Bilbao, Spain.
Diana	United Kingdom	The ship was wrecked at Riga, Russia. Her crew were rescued. She was on a voyage from Aberdeen to Riga.
Harbinger	United Kingdom	The ship ran aground and was severely damaged at Riga.
HMS Papillon	Royal Navy	The brig separated from a convoy in the Atlantic Ocean on this date. No further trace, presumed foundered with the loss of all hands.
Sedulous	United Kingdom	The ship was wrecked at Riga. Her crew were rescued.
Wemys	United Kingdom	The ship was wrecked at Riga. Her crew were rescued. She was on a voyage from Copenhagen, Denmark to Riga.

=== 26 September ===
List of shipwrecks: 26 September 1805
Ship	State	Description
Catherine	United Kingdom	The ship foundered in the Atlantic Ocean with the loss of all hands. She was on a voyage from the Leeward Islands to the United Kingdom.
Goldfinch	United Kingdom	The ship foundered in the Atlantic Ocean with the loss of all hands. She was on a voyage from the Leeward Islands to the United Kingdom.
Providence	United Kingdom	The ship was abandoned in the Atlantic Ocean while on a voyage from the Leeward Islands to the United Kingdom. Her crew were rescued.
Union	United Kingdom	The ship foundered in the Atlantic Ocean with the loss of all but two of her crew. She was on a voyage from the Leeward Islands to the United Kingdom.

=== 29 September ===
List of shipwrecks: 29 September 1805
Ship	State	Description
Albertina	Stettin	The ship was wrecked on the Goodwin Sands, Kent, United Kingdom. Her crew were rescued. She was on a voyage from Stettin to Bordeaux, Gironde, France.

=== 30 September ===
List of shipwrecks: 30 September 1805
Ship	State	Description
Anne	United States	The ship was wrecked in the Atlantic Ocean. Her crew were rescued on 3 October by Diana (United Kingdom). Anne was on a voyage from Virginia to Bordeaux, Gironde, France.
The Brothers	Denmark-Norway	The brig ran aground and was wrecked in the Queen's Channel, 8 nautical miles (15 km) off Margate, Kent, United Kingdom. Her crew were rescued.
HMS Seaforth	Royal Navy	The ship foundered off Antigua with the loss of 84 of her 86 crew.

=== Unknown date ===
List of shipwrecks: Unknown date in September 1805
Ship	State	Description
Admiral Nelson	United Kingdom	The ship foundered in the North Sea while on a voyage from Danzig, to Liverpool, Lancashire. Her crew were rescued by HM Hired armed ship Blessing (Royal Navy).
Almira	United Kingdom	The ship ran aground on the Burbo Bank, in Liverpool Bay and was damaged. She was refloated and put into Liverpool.
Association	United Kingdom	The ship was wrecked on the African coast while on a voyage from Gibraltar to the Cape Verde Islands. Two of her crew were killed by natives.
Betsey	United Kingdom	The ship was driven ashore in Courtmasherry Bay. She was on a voyage from Saint Thomas, Virgin Islands to Greenock, Renfrewshire.
Braderne Erntz and Lorentz	Flag unknown	The ship was lost near Margate, Kent, United Kingdom. She was on a voyage from London to Plymouth, Devon, United Kingdom.
Diana	Stettin	The ship was driven ashore and wrecked near Calais, France. She was on a voyage from Stettin to Bordeaux, Gironde, France.
Drie Gebroeders	Danzig	The ship was driven ashore and wrecked on Hiddensee, Swedish Pomerania. She was on a voyage from Danzig to Londonderry, United Kingdom.
Eliza	United Kingdom	The ship departed from Liverpool for Newfoundland, British North America. No further trace, presumed foundered with the loss of all hands.
Hamlet	United Kingdom	The ship was driven ashore and wrecked at Liverpool.
Isabella	United Kingdom	The ship was wrecked on Newfoundland.
Juno	United Kingdom	The ship departed Tortola for the United Kingdom. No further trace, presumed foundered with the loss of all hands.
Speculator	United Kingdom	The ship was severely damaged at St. George's Dock, Liverpool.
Success	United Kingdom	The ship was wrecked at sea and was abandoned. Her crew were rescued by HMS Rattler (Royal Navy). She was on a voyage from Falmouth, Cornwall, to Newfoundland.
Thomas	United Kingdom	The ship lost her rudder while on a voyage from Jamaica to Liverpool. She was abandoned and set afire.
William	United Kingdom	The ship sprang a leak and foundered in the Atlantic Ocean. She was on a voyage from London to Newfoundland.
William	United Kingdom	The ship ran aground of the Goodwin Sands, Kent. She was on a voyage from London to Rotterdam, South Holland, Batavian Republic. She was refloated and taken in to The Downs.
Zeelust	Duchy of Holstein	The ship was lost in the Eyder. She was on a voyage from Jersey, Channel Islands, to Tönningen.

== October ==
=== 1 October ===
List of shipwrecks: 1 October 1805
Ship	State	Description
Mary	United Kingdom	The ship foundered off "Neuvork" while on a voyage from London to Tönning, Duchy of Holstein.

=== 3 October ===
List of shipwrecks: 3 October 1805
Ship	State	Description
HMS Barracouta	Royal Navy	The Ballahoo-class schooner ran aground and was wrecked 3 nautical miles (5.6 km) off Padro Kay, Bahamas. Her crew survived.
Grace & Ann	(United Kingdom of Great Britain and Ireland) Nevis	The ship foundered whilst on a voyage from Nevis to New York, United States. Thirteen of her crew were rescued.
Lady Sinclair	United Kingdom	The ship sprang a leak while on a voyage from Jamaica to Leith, Lothian. She was set afire and abandoned by her crew.

=== 4 October ===
List of shipwrecks: 4 October 1805
Ship	State	Description
Providence	United Kingdom	The ship was driven ashore at Weymouth, Dorset.

=== 5 October ===
List of shipwrecks: 5 October 1805
Ship	State	Description
Dispach (Диспач, 'Dispatch')	Imperial Russian Navy	The brig was wrecked without loss of life at Wittow, Rügen, in the Baltic Sea during a storm.

=== 8 October ===
List of shipwrecks: 8 October 1805
Ship	State	Description
No. 3	Imperial Russian Navy	The transport ship was driven ashore and wrecked in the mouth of the Narva River.

=== 11 October ===
List of shipwrecks: 11 October 1805
Ship	State	Description
HMS Squib	United Kingdom	The fire ship was driven ashore and wrecked at Deal, Kent. Her crew were rescued.

=== 14 October ===
List of shipwrecks: 14 October 1805
Ship	State	Description
Northumberland	United Kingdom	The ship was wrecked at Charleston, South Carolina, United States. Her crew were rescued. She was on a voyage from Jamaica to London.

=== 15 October ===
List of shipwrecks: 15 October 1805
Ship	State	Description
Dorothea	Denmark	The brig was blown in two and sunk by an experimental Torpedo in a demonstration in Walmer Road, a mile off Walmer Castle, near Deal, England.
Nestor	United Kingdom	The ship was abandoned by her crew, who were rescued by HMS Heron (Royal Navy) She was on a voyage from Liverpool, Lancashire, to Portland, Dorset.

=== 17 October ===
List of shipwrecks: 17 October 1805
Ship	State	Description
Atlantic	United States	The ship was driven ashore on Texel, North Holland, Batavian Republic.
Eleanor	United Kingdom	The ship ran aground near Porto, Portugal and was wrecked.

=== 18 October ===
List of shipwrecks: 18 October 1805
Ship	State	Description
Friends	United Kingdom	The troopship was wrecked on Bornholm, Denmark. All on board were rescued.
Kadyak (Кадьяк, 'Kodiak')	Imperial Russian Navy	The ship was driven ashore at Cape Birandzha, opposite Medvezhy Island in Uda Bay of the Sea of Okhotsk. Her crew survived. They returned the following year, unloaded, and then burned her as a total loss.

=== 20 October ===
List of shipwrecks: 20 October 1805
Ship	State	Description
Good Intent	United Kingdom	The brig was run down and sunk by another vessel. Five of her crew were rescued.

=== 21 October ===
List of shipwrecks: 21 October 1805
Ship	State	Description
Achille	French Navy	War of the Third Coalition: Battle of Trafalgar: The Téméraire-class ship of the line caught fire, exploded and sank with the loss of 480 of her 638 crew.
Argonauta	Spanish Navy	War of the Third Coalition: Battle of Trafalgar: The ship of the line was driven ashore and wrecked at Cádiz.

=== 22 October ===
List of shipwrecks: 22 October 1805
Ship	State	Description
Aigle	French Navy	The ship of the line was driven ashore and wrecked on the Spanish coast.
Algeziras	Spanish Navy	The ship was driven ashore near Cádiz. She was refloated and taken in to Cádiz.
Berwick	French Navy	The Elizabeth-class ship of the line was driven ashore and wrecked near Sanlúcar de Barrameda, Spain with the loss of over 200 lives.
Fougueux	French Navy	The Téméraire-class ship of the line was driven ashore and wrecked near Torre Bermeja, Spain. There were 25 survivors.
Indomptable	French Navy	The Tonnant-class ship of the line was driven ashore and wrecked near Rota, Spain. There were around 150 survivors of the 1,200 people on board.
Nuestra Señora de la Santísima Trinidad	Spanish Navy	The first-rate ship of the line foundered in the Atlantic Ocean off the coast of Spain.
Redoutable	French Navy	The Téméraire-class ship of the line foundered in the Atlantic Ocean off the coast of Spain.
San Agustin	Spanish Navy	The ship of the line was wrecked on the Spanish coast.
Santa Ana	Spanish Navy	The Santa Ana-class ship of the line was driven ashore at Cádiz. She was refloated and taken in to Cádiz.
Two Friends	United Kingdom	The troopship was driven ashore on Cape Breton Island, British North America and was wrecked with the loss of three of the 150 people on board.

=== 23 October ===
List of shipwrecks: 23 October 1805
Ship	State	Description
Aeneas	United Kingdom	The troopship was driven ashore and wrecked near Cape Ray, Newfoundland, British North America with the loss of 340 of the 347 people on board.
Bucentaure	French Navy	The Bucentaure-class ship of the line was wrecked on the Spanish coast.
Intrépide	French Navy	The third-rate ship of the line was scuttled on the orders of Admiral Collingwood.
Nais	United Kingdom	The transport ship was wrecked on a reef off Port aux Basques, Newfoundland with the loss of 240 of the 247 people on board.
Neptuno	Spanish Navy	The Montañes-class ship of the line was driven ashore and wrecked near Cádiz.
San Francisco de Asis	Spanish Navy	The ship of the line was wrecked near Puerto de Santa Maria.

=== 24 October ===
List of shipwrecks: 24 October 1805
Ship	State	Description
Endeavour	United Kingdom	The ship was driven ashore near Londonderry. She was on a voyage from the West Indies to the Clyde.
Lark	United Kingdom	The ship was wrecked on the Swine Bottoms.
Unity	United Kingdom	The ship was driven ashore in Belfast Lough. She was on a voyage from the West Indies to the Clyde.
Unnamed	United Kingdom	The brig was driven ashore in the Belfast Lough.
Unnamed	United Kingdom	The schooner was driven ashore in the Belfast Lough.

=== 26 October ===
List of shipwrecks: 26 October 1805
Ship	State	Description
Charles	United Kingdom	The ship was lost at Dublin. Her crew were rescued.
Deborah	United Kingdom	The ship was driven ashore and wrecked on Goose Island, Lake Ontario, British North America.
Duke of York	United Kingdom	The ship was wrecked at the mouth of the Charles River, Lower Canada, British North America.
Glory	United Kingdom	The ship ran aground on the White Bank, in the Irish Sea off County Dublin.
Monarca	Spanish Navy	The ship of the line was wrecked off Sanlúcar de Barrameda.
Rayo	Spanish Navy	With a British prize crew aboard, the ship of the line was wrecked on the coast of Spain. The prize crew burned her wreck on 31 October.

=== 28 October ===
List of shipwrecks: 28 October 1805
Ship	State	Description
Adventure	United Kingdom	The ship, which was under tow by Mary & Hannah (United Kingdom, parted her tow and was presumed to have subsequently foundered. She was on a voyage from Surinam to Liverpool, Lancashire.
Victory	United Kingdom	The ship foundered while on a voyage from Barbados to Cork. Her crew were rescued.

=== Unknown date ===
List of shipwrecks: Unknown date in October 1805
Ship	State	Description
Alexander	Russia	The ship was driven ashore and wrecked near Ostend, Lys, France. She was on a voyage from Saint Petersburg to A Coruña, Spain.
Betsey	United Kingdom	The sloop was lost near Wexford.
Brothers	United Kingdom	The ship was wrecked in the Orkney Islands while on a voyage from London to Tönning, Duchy of Holstein.
Clyde	United Kingdom	War of the Third Coalition: The ship was captured and sunk by Phaeton and Voltigeur (both French Navy). She was on a voyage from the Clyde to Newfoundland, British North America.
Cosmo	United Kingdom	The ship was lost at Riga, Russia. She was on a voyage from Liverpool, Lancashire, to Riga.
Diana	United Kingdom	The ship ran aground on the Haisborough Sand, in the North Sea off the coast of Norfolk and was damaged. She was on a voyage from Memel, Prussia to Liverpool. She was refloated and taken in to Great Yarmouth, Norfolk.
Dover	United Kingdom	The ship was wrecked near Riga. She was on a voyage from Riga to London.
Friends	United Kingdom	The ship was wrecked on Bornholm, Denmark. All on board were rescued.
Friends	United Kingdom	The ship was wrecked on Newfoundland, British North America. She was on a voyage from Quebec City, Lower Canada, British North America to Cork.
Haddock	United Kingdom	The ship was driven ashore on Gotland, Sweden while on a voyage from Saint Petersburgh to London.
Happy Return	United Kingdom	The ship was driven ashore near Drogheda, County Louth.
Holm	Danzig	The ship was driven ashore near Danzig.
Hope	United Kingdom	The ship departed from Pillau, Prussia. No further trace, presumed foundered with the loss of all hands.
Hope	United Kingdom	The ship departed from British Honduras for Hull, Yorkshire. No further trace, presumed foundered with the loss of all hands.
John & William	United Kingdom	The ship was driven ashore at Lymington, Hampshire.
Lion	United Kingdom	The ship was driven ashore near Drogheda.
Mary Hall	United Kingdom	The ship was wrecked on the Stoney Binks, in the North Sea off the coast of County Durham. Her crew were rescued.
Mermaid	United Kingdom	The ship was wrecked on the Pentland Skerries.
Nero	United Kingdom	The ship sprang a leak. She was abandoned and set afire. She was on a voyage from Jamaica to London.
Oneida Chief	United States	The ship was wrecked on Heligoland. She was on a voyage from Tönningen, Duchy of Holstein to New York.
Pallas	United Kingdom	The ship foundered while on a voyage from Liverpool to London.
Ptolomeas	Danzig	The ship was driven ashore near Danzig.
Seaflower	United Kingdom	The ship was lost in Fishguard Bay. She was on a voyage from Swansea, Glamorgan, to an Irish port.
Sturdy Beggar	United Kingdom	The ship was driven ashore at Fishguard, Pembrokeshire. Her crew were rescued. She was on a voyage from Bristol, Gloucestershire, to Dublin.
Swartel Alt	Denmark-Norway	The ship foundered in the Atlantic Ocean while on a voyage from Saint Croix, Virgin Islands to Copenhagen. Her crew were rescued by Maria Jane (United States).
Thomas	United Kingdom	The ship sprang a leak at sea. She was set afire and abandoned. She was on a voyage from Jamaica to Liverpool.
Union	United Kingdom	The ship was wrecked on the Stoney Binks. Her crew were rescued.
12 unnamed vessels	Russia	The transport ships were wrecked on the coast of the Courland Governorate with the loss of nearly 1,200 lives.
25 unnamed vessels	Flags unknown	The ships were wrecked on the coast of the Courland Governorate.
Three unnamed vessels	United Kingdom	The transport ships were lost on 6 and 7 October. They were on voyages from Riga to Swedish Pomerania.

== November ==
=== 1 November ===
List of shipwrecks: 1 November 1805
Ship	State	Description
Britannia	United Kingdom	The East Indiaman was lost at Rocas Atoll. She was carrying troops and stores under contract from London for the British attack on the Dutch Cape Colony. (The report in Lloyd's List, is in error.)
Harland	United Kingdom	The ship foundered in the Baltic Sea 20 nautical miles (37 km) off Memel, Prussia. Her crew were rescued. She was on a voyage from Hull, Yorkshire to Memel.
King George	United Kingdom	The ship was lost at Rocas Atoll. She was carrying troops and stores from London for the British attack on the Dutch Cape Colony. (The report in Lloyd's List, is in error.)
Unnamed	United Kingdom	The brig ran aground off Margate, Kent and was damaged. She was refloated and taken in to Margate.

=== 3 November ===
List of shipwrecks: 3 November 1805
Ship	State	Description
Atalante	French Navy	The Virginie-class frigate was driven ashore at the Cape of Good Hope. She was later refloated.

=== 4 November ===
List of shipwrecks: 4 November 1805
Ship	State	Description
Maria	United Kingdom	The ship foundered whilst on a voyage from Quebec City, Lower Canada, British North America to London. Her crew were rescued by HMS Pallas (Royal Navy).
Peggy	United Kingdom	The ship was wrecked at Ballantrae, Ayrshire. All four crew were rescued.

=== 6 November ===
List of shipwrecks: 6 November 1805
Ship	State	Description
Laurentia Charlotte	Denmark	The ship was driven ashore near Varberg, Sweden. She was on a voyage from Saint Croix, Danish West Indies to Copenhagen.

=== 10 November ===
List of shipwrecks: 10 November 1805
Ship	State	Description
HMS Biter	Royal Navy	War of the Third Coalition: The gun-brig was sunk by enemy action at Étaples, Pas-de-Calais, France. Her crew survived.

=== 12 November ===
List of shipwrecks: November 1805
Ship	State	Description
Diligence	United Kingdom	The ship sprang a leak and was abandoned by all but one of her crew. She was subsequently towed in to Kinsale, County Cork, in a waterlogged condition. Diligence was on a voyage from Dungarvan, County Waterford, to London.

=== 13 November ===
List of shipwrecks: 13 November 1805
Ship	State	Description
Hampden	United Kingdom	The ship was wrecked on the Irish coast. She was on a voyage from Saint Vincent to London.
HMS Woodlark	Royal Navy	War of the Third Coalition: During a voyage from Lowestoft to Plymouth, the gun-brig was wrecked at Calais, France. Her pilot and crew surrendered to the French and remained prisoners-of-war until 1814.

=== 14 November ===
List of shipwrecks: 14 November 1805
Ship	State	Description
Johan Ferdinand	Stettin	The ship was driven ashore near Swinemünde, Swedish Pomerania. She was on a voyage from Stettin to Liverpool, Lancashire, United Kingdom.
Perseverance	United Kingdom	The brig bound from Dublin to London struck the Seven Stones Reef during fog. Her crew rowed to St Mary's, Isles of Scilly.

=== 15 November ===
List of shipwrecks: 15 November 1805
Ship	State	Description
Antelope	United Kingdom	The transport ship was driven ashore and wrecked on Wangerooge, Kingdom of Hanover. All 207 people on board survived.

=== 16 November ===
List of shipwrecks: 16 November 1805
Ship	State	Description
Betsey	United Kingdom	The ship was wrecked on Götaland, Sweden. Her crew were rescued. She was on a voyage from Saint Petersburg, Russia to London.
Caroline	United Kingdom	The ship was driven ashore at Helsingør, Denmark. She was refloated in December and taken in to Copenhagen for repairs.

=== 17 November ===
List of shipwrecks: 17 November 1805
Ship	State	Description
Ceres	United Kingdom	The ship was in collision with HMS Fisgard (Royal Navy) off Madeira and was severely damaged. She was declared a total loss on arrival at Barbados from London.
Themis	United Kingdom	The ship was lost near Memel, Prussia. She was on a voyage from Memel to London.

=== 18 November ===
List of shipwrecks: 18 November 1805
Ship	State	Description
Bonne Resolution or Labonn Resolution	Danzig	The ship was wrecked in Vaila Sound, Shetland Islands. Her crew were rescued. She was on a voyage from Liverpool to Danzig.
Hampden	United Kingdom	The ship was wrecked on the Irish coast. Her crew were rescued. She was on a voyage from Saint Vincent to Liverpool, Lancashire.

=== 19 November ===
List of shipwrecks: 19 November 1805
Ship	State	Description
Arun	United Kingdom	The ship was driven ashore near Hurst Castle, Hampshire. She was on a voyage from Portsmouth, Hampshire to Gibraltar. She was refloated and put back to Portsmouth.
Two unnamed vessels	United Kingdom	The ships were driven ashore near Hurst Castle. They were refloated.

=== 20 November ===
List of shipwrecks: 20 November 1805
Ship	State	Description
Two Friends	United Kingdom	The transport ship was wrecked on Cape Breton Island, Nova Scotia, British North America. Her crew were rescued.

=== 21 November ===
List of shipwrecks: 21 November 1805
Ship	State	Description
Betsey	United Kingdom	The schooner was wrecked off Balambangan Island. She was on a voyage from Macau to Sydney, New South Wales. Only two of her twelve crew were to survive.
Time & Chance	United Kingdom	The ship foundered off Cape Breton Island, British North America. She was on a voyage from Bay Chaleur, British North America to Boston, Massachusetts.

=== 24 November ===
List of shipwrecks: 24 November 1805
Ship	State	Description
Hope	United Kingdom	The ship was wrecked on Scotstown Head. She was on a voyage from Leith, Lothian, to Wick, Caithness.

=== 25 November ===
List of shipwrecks: 25 November 1805
Ship	State	Description
Esther	United Kingdom	The ship was driven ashore at Quebec City, Lower Canada, British North America. She was on a voyage from Quebec City to Liverpool, Lancashire.
Mary	United Kingdom	The ship was driven ashore and wrecked on Bornholm, Denmark. She was on a voyage from London to Danzig.

=== 27 November ===
List of shipwrecks: 27 November 1805
Ship	State	Description
Packet	United Kingdom	The ship departed from São Miguel, Azores for the Clyde. No further trace, presumed foundered with the loss of all hands.

=== 28 November ===
List of shipwrecks: 28 November 1805
Ship	State	Description
Unnamed	United Kingdom	The schooner was driven ashore south of "Petully".

=== 30 November ===
List of shipwrecks: 30 November 1805
Ship	State	Description
Cotton Planter	United States	The ship ran aground off Den Helder, North Holland, Batavian Republic.
Hunter	United States	The ship foundered off Bermuda. Her crew were rescued. She was on a voyage from New York to Martinique.
John	United Kingdom	The ship was driven ashore near Helsingør, Denmark. She was on a voyage from Riga, Russia to Hull, Yorkshire. John was later refloated and taken in to Copenhagen, Denmark.
Montgomery	United Kingdom	The ship was taken in to Great Yarmouth, Norfolk with only her owner aboard and having had several holes bored in her bottom.
HMS Pigeon	Royal Navy	The cutter was wrecked off Texel, North Holland, Batavian Republic. Her crew were rescued but were taken prisoner by the Dutch.

=== Unknown date ===
List of shipwrecks: Unknown date in November 1805
Ship	State	Description
Alexander	United Kingdom	The ship was driven ashore at Viana do Castelo, Portugal and was wrecked. She was on a voyage from Liverpool, Lancashire, to an African port.
Almeria	United Kingdom	The ship foundered in the Baltic Sea off Bornholm, Denmark while on a voyage from Saint Petersburg, Russia to London. Her crew were rescued.
Atlas	United Kingdom	The ship was wrecked at Memel, Prussia. She was on a voyage from Liverpool to Memel.
Blandford	United Kingdom	The ship was driven ashore on the Essex coast and was wrecked. She was on a voyage from Tönning, Duchy of Holstein to London.
Britannia	United Kingdom	The ship was wrecked on the coast of Brazil before 8 November with the loss of one life.
Cancer	United Kingdom	The "double-boat" foundered off the French coast.
Catherine	United Kingdom	The ship was abandoned in the North Sea off Flamborough Head, Yorkshire. She was subsequently towed in to Bridlington.
Cesurewitz Paulovna Constantia	Russia	The ship was driven ashore and wrecked on the Dutch coast. She was on a voyage from Riga to Portsmouth, Hampshire, United Kingdom.
HM Hired armed ship Charlotte	Royal Navy	The hired armed ship was driven into the Kenmare River, County Kerry and was severely damaed. Her crew survived.
Coyme	United Kingdom	The ship was wrecked near Riga, Russia.
Diana	United States	The ship was driven ashore near Portsmouth, Hampshire.
Diana	United Kingdom	The ship was wrecked near Riga.
Duteous	United Kingdom	The ship was wrecked near Danzig. She was on a voyage from Pillau, Prussia to Plymouth, Devon.
Friendship	United Kingdom	The ship was abandoned in the North Sea. She was subsequently towed in to Great Yarmouth, Norfolk by HMS Imogen (Royal Navy).
Gemini	United Kingdom	The "double-boat" foundered off the Kent coast.
Hector	United Kingdom	The ship was driven ashore and wrecked in the Bristol Channel. She was on a voyage from Plymouth to Chepstow, Monmouthshire.
Hero	United Kingdom	The brig was destroyed by fire at Portsmouth, Hampshire.
Hoffnung	flag unknown	The ship was driven ashore at Villaviciosa, Spain. She was on a voyage from Cowes, Isle of Wight, United Kingdom to Bilbao, Spain.
Hope	United Kingdom	The ship was driven ashore and wrecked at Toolse, Russia. She was on a voyage from Narva, Russia to Liverpool.
John & Richard	United Kingdom	The ship foundered while on a voyage from Stockholm, Sweden to London. Her crew were rescued.
Lark	United Kingdom	The ship was wrecked near Hogeness, Sweden.
Liberty	United Kingdom	The ship was driven ashore near Dragør, Denmark.
Manchester	United Kingdom	The ship was wrecked near Riga.
Mary	United Kingdom	The ship foundered off Donaghadee, County Down, while on a voyage from Irvine, Ayrshire, to Carrickfergus, County Antrim.
Providence	United Kingdom	The ship foundered in the North Sea off Orfordness, Suffolk. Her crew were rescued.
Sophia	Denmark	The ship was captured and burnt by Minerve (French Navy) before 18 November.
St. Michael	Sweden	The brig was wrecked on the Swine Bottoms. Her crew were rescued. She was on a voyage from Saint-Barthélemy to Stockholm.
Themis	United Kingdom	The ship was driven ashore and wrecked 2 nautical miles (3.7 km) north of Memel, Prussia. Her crew were rescued by the Memel Lifeboat.
Thomas and Mary	United Kingdom	The ship was driven ashore at Wexford. She was on a voyage from Bristol, Gloucestershire to Wexford.
Zeepard	United Netherlands Navy	The frigate was driven ashore and wrecked on Texel.
Unnamed	United Kingdom	The full-rigged ship was driven ashore at Memel. Her crew were rescued by the Memel Lifeboat.
Unnamed	United Kingdom	The brig was driven ashore at Memel. Her crew were rescued by the Memel Lifeboat.

== December ==
=== 2 December ===
List of shipwrecks: 2 December 1805
Ship	State	Description
Abby	United Kingdom	The ship departed from Whitehaven for Dublin. No further trace, presumed foundered in the Irish Sea with the loss of all hands.

=== 6 December ===
List of shipwrecks: 6 December 1805
Ship	State	Description
Andromache	United States	The ship was wrecked on the Florida Reef. She was on a voyage from Jamaica to New York.
Lauentia Charlotte	Denmark	The ship was driven ashore and wrecked near "Warberg". She was on a voyage from Saint Croix to Copenhagen.

=== 7 December ===
List of shipwrecks: 7 December 1805
Ship	State	Description
Mancle, or Manula	United Kingdom	The ship was seen off Ouessant, Finistère, France. No further trace, presumed foundered with the loss of all hands. She was on a voyage from Gibraltar to London.
Three Friends	United Kingdom	The ship departed from Guernsey, Channel Islands, for London. No further trace, presumed foundered with the loss of all hands.

=== 10 December ===
List of shipwrecks: 10 December 1805
Ship	State	Description
Swan	United Kingdom	The ship was driven onto the Herd Sand, in the North Sea the coast of County Durham and was wrecked.

=== 11 December ===
List of shipwrecks: 11 December 1805
Ship	State	Description
Johns	United Kingdom	The ship was driven ashore on the Isle of Bute. She was on a voyage from the Clyde to Jamaica. Johns was refloated in January 1806.

=== 13 December ===
List of shipwrecks: December 1805
Ship	State	Description
George Washington	United States	The ship was driven ashore at Margate, Kent, United Kingdom.

=== 14 December ===
List of shipwrecks: 14 December 1805
Ship	State	Description
Atalanta	United Kingdom	The transport ship foundered in the English Channel off Calais, France with the loss of all 40 men on board.
Atalanta	United Kingdom	The ship was wrecked at Mytiline, Lesbos, Greece. She was on a voyage from Smyrna, Ottoman Empire, to London.
Jenny	United Kingdom	The transport ship, a brig, was driven ashore at Gravelines, Nord, France. All 148 people on board were rescued, but were made prisoners by the French.
Maria, or Mary	United Kingdom	The transport ship was wrecked on the Haaks Bank, in the North Sea off the Dutch coast with the loss of 244 of the 270 men on board.

=== 15 December ===
List of shipwrecks: 15 December 1805
Ship	State	Description
Mary	United Kingdom	War of the Third Coalition: The brig was driven ashore and wrecked at Caen, Calvados, France. Her nine crew survived, but were made prisoner by the French. She was on a voyage from London to Dublin. f

=== 16 December ===
List of shipwrecks: 16 December 1805
Ship	State	Description
Ariadne	United Kingdom	The transport ship was driven ashore and wrecked near Sangatte, Pas-de-Calais, France. All 358 people on board, most of them soldiers from the 9th Regiment of Foot, were rescued and conducted to Calais.
Aurora	United Kingdom	The transport ship was wrecked on the Goodwin Sands, Kent with the loss of all on board, over 250 men, many from the 26th Regiment of Foot.

=== 17 December ===
List of shipwrecks: 17 December 1805
Ship	State	Description
Lady Parker	United Kingdom	The full-rigged ship was run into by the full-rigged ship Independence (United States) was driven ashore and severely damaged in the Clyde. She was on a voyage from Greenock, Renfrewshire to Liverpool, Lancashire and Virginia, United States. She was refloated on 23 December and taken in to Greenock for repairs.
Union	United Kingdom	The schooner was wrecked near Castlecraig, Ayrshire with the loss of a crew member. She was on a voyage from Newfoundland, British North America to Glasgow, Renfrewshire.

=== 19 December ===
List of shipwrecks: 19 December 1805
Ship	State	Description
Ganges	United Kingdom	War of the Third Coalition: The whaler was captured by a French squadron and was sunk. She was on a voyage from London to the South Seas.
Providence	United Kingdom	The ship ran aground on the Newcombe Sand, in the North Sea off the coast of Suffolk. She was on a voyage from London to Hull, Yorkshire. She was refloated and taken in to Great Yarmouth, Norfolk for repairs.

=== 20 December ===
List of shipwrecks: 20 December 1805
Ship	State	Description
Armida	Portugal	The ship was wrecked on a reef off Port Saline, Grenada.

=== 23 December ===
List of shipwrecks: 23 December 1805
Ship	State	Description
Elizabeth	United Kingdom	The ship foundered in the English Channel off Beachy Head, Sussex with the loss of her captain. She was on a voyage from Swanage, Dorset, to Woolwich, Kent.

=== 24 December ===
List of shipwrecks: 24 December 1805
Ship	State	Description
Ann	United Kingdom	The sloop was driven ashore on Jura. She was on a voyage from Greenock, Renfrewshire, to Sligo.
Helder	United Kingdom	The transport ship was wrecked on the Dutch coast. All 640 people on board survived, but were taken prisoner.

=== 25 December ===
List of shipwrecks: 25 December 1805
Ship	State	Description
Friends	United Kingdom	The ship ran aground on the Skitter Sand, in the Humber. She was on a voyage from Helsingør, Denmark to Hull, Yorkshire.She was refloatedf.
Napoleon	France	War of the Fourth Coalition: The privateer was driven ashore and wrecked near the Cape of Good Hope, Cape Colony by HMS Narcissus (Royal Navy). Napoleon was on a voyage from Table Bay to Mauritius.

=== 26 December ===
List of shipwrecks: 26 December 1805
Ship	State	Description
Gerathewol	Sweden	The ship was driven ashore on the south coast of the Isle of Wight, United Kingdom. Her crew were rescued. She was on a voyage from St. Ubes, Spain to Gothenburg.
Hope	United Kingdom	The ship foundered in the North Sea off Flamborough Head, Yorkshire with the loss of all hands.
Jane	United Kingdom	The ship was lost with all hands near Great Yarmouth, Norfolk. She was on a voyage from Southampton, Hampshire, to Newcastle upon Tyne, Northumberland.

=== 27 December ===
List of shipwrecks: 27 December 1805
Ship	State	Description
Carl Salomon	United Kingdom	The ship was driven ashore and wrecked near Beachy Head, Sussex. Her crew were rescued. She was on a voyage from Alicante, Spain to Jakobstad, Sweden.
Catherine	United Kingdom	The brig was driven ashore and wrecked at Deal, Kent. She was on a voyage from South Shields, County Durham to Grenada.
Unnamed	Flag unknown	The ship was driven ashore near Happisburgh, Norfolk, United Kingdom.

=== 28 December ===
List of shipwrecks: 28 December 1805
Ship	State	Description
Maria Juliana	Prussia	The ship foundered in the North Sea off the coast of Holland. She was on a voyage from Bordeaux, Gironde, France to Emden.

=== Unknown date ===
List of shipwrecks: Unknown date in December 1805
Ship	State	Description
Adeona	United Kingdom	The ship was driven ashore. She was refloated and taken in to Copenhagen, Denmark for repairs.
Adventure	United Kingdom	The transport ship was wrecked on the Cockle Sand, in the North Sea off Great Yarmouth, Norfolk. Her crew were rescued.
Alexander	Denmark	The ship was driven ashore near Kirkwall, Orkney Islands, United Kingdom. She was on a voyage from Copenhagen to Saint Thomas, Virgin Islands.
Amezade	Spain	The ship was wrecked at Grenada. She was on a voyage from "San Salvadore" to "Perra".
Andros Coggin	Portugal	The ship was driven ashore at Margate, Kent, United Kingdom.
Ann & Susan	United Kingdom	The ship foundered while on a voyage from a Welsh port to Fowey, Cornwall.
Atlantic	United Kingdom	The ship was driven ashore on the south coast of the Isle of Wight. She was on a voyage from Cardiff, Glamorgan, to London.
Belona	Danzig	The ship was driven ashore near Danzig. She was on a voyage from Liverpool, Lancashire, United Kingdom to Danzig.
Berbice	United Kingdom	The ship was wrecked near Valencia, Spain. She was on a voyage from Spain to London.
Berwick	United Kingdom	The ship sank at Ramsgate, Kent. She was on a voyage from London to Barbados. Berwick was refloated in January 1806 and taken to the Thames.
Betsey	United Kingdom	The ship foundered off St. Ives, Cornwall.
Betsey	United Kingdom	The ship sprang a leak and foundered in Liverpool Bay. Her crew were rescued. She was on a voyage from Liverpool to Halifax, Nova Scotia, British North America.
Caledonia	United Kingdom	The ship was driven ashore near Ramsey, Isle of Man.
Catharine	United Kingdom	The ship was driven ashore and wrecked near Walmer Castle, Kent. She was on a voyage from South Shields, County Durham, to Grenada.
Charles	United Kingdom	The ship was driven ashore at Margate. She was on a voyage from London to Southampton, Hampshire.
Columbia	United States	The ship was driven ashore on the Lancashire coast. She was on a voyage from Massachusetts to Liverpool.
Courier	Hamburg	The ship was driven ashore near Calais, France. She was on a voyage from Great Yarmouth to Liverpool, England.
Diligence	United Kingdom	The ship was driven ashore and wrecked near Great Yarmouth with the loss of four of her crew. She was on a voyage from New York, United States to Hull, Yorkshire.
Elizaveta (or Zakharii I Elizaveta)	Russia	The vessel was wrecked in Russian America between Kodiak and Novo-Arkhangelsk.
Ellison	United Kingdom	The ship was driven ashore in the Baltic Sea. She was refloated.
Fanny	United Kingdom	The ship was driven ashore at Burnham-on-Crouch, Essex. She was on a voyage from Danzig to London.
Hanover Planter	United Kingdom	The ship was driven ashore in the River Avon. She was on a voyage from Bristol, Gloucestershire, to Saint Kitts.
Harmony	United Kingdom	The ship was driven ashore at Bawdsey, Suffolk.. She was on a voyage from Danzig to London.
Henry	United Kingdom	The ship was driven ashore in the Baltic Sea. She was refloated.
Hero	United Kingdom	The ship was driven ashore at Lowestoft, Suffolk. Her crew were rescued.
Isabella	United Kingdom	The transport ship was wrecked on Texel, North Holland, Batavian Republic with the loss of 135 of the 300 men on board.
Java	United Kingdom	The ship was destroyed by fire at Livorno, Grand Duchy of Tuscany.
Jessie	United States	The ship was wrecked near Boulogne, Pas-de-Calais, France. She was on a voyage from Virginia to Antwerp, Deux-Nèthes, France.
John	United Kingdom	The ship was driven ashore near Reval, Russia. She was on a voyage from Saint Petersburg, Russia to Montrose, Forfarshire.
Joseph	United Kingdom	The ship was lost near Christiansand, Norway. She was on a voyage from Arkhangelsk, Russia to London.
Julia	United States	The ship was driven ashore at Madeira.
Lady Shaw Stewart	United Kingdom	War of the Third Coalition: The transport ship was captured and burnt by a squadron of eleven ships including Castor, Éole, Félicité, Foudroyant, Impétueux, Patriote, Valeureuse and Vétéran (all French Navy).
Lovely Cruizer	United Kingdom	The ship was driven ashore at St. Ives, Cornwall. She was on a voyage from Neath, Glamorgan, to Dartmouth, Devon.
Margaret & Lucretia	Duchy of Holstein	The ship was driven ashore at Lisbon, Portugal.
Mariner	United Kingdom	The brig ran aground on the Herd Sand, in the North Sea. She was refloated in January 1806. Her crew were rescued by the lifeboat Northumberland (United Kingdom). She was refloated in January 1806.
Mary	United Kingdom	The ship was wrecked near Riga, Russia.
Mary	United Kingdom	The ship was driven ashore at Lowestoft. Her crew were rescued.
Mary	United Kingdom	The ship was lost near Domesnes, Norway. Her crew were rescued.
Mary Ann	United Kingdom	The ship sank at Ramsgate. She was on a voyage from London to Trinidad.
Melton	United Kingdom	The ship was driven ashore in the Baltic Sea. She was refloated.
Nackgiebigkeit	Prussia	The ship was lost at Hela. She was on a voyage from London to Königsberg.
Norfolk	United Kingdom	The ship foundered in the Baltic Sea. She was on a voyage from London to Memel, Prussia.
Peace	United Kingdom	The transport ship, a brig, was driven ashore and wrecked at Kessingland, Suffolk. All on board, more than 130 people, were rescued.
Peggy	United Kingdom	The ship foundered in the North Sea off Harwich, Essex. She was on a voyage from Riga to London.
Peggy	United Kingdom	The ship was wrecked near Portreath, Cornwall. She was on a voyage from Cork to Padstow, Cornwall.
Percy	United Kingdom	The ship was wrecked near Riga.
Phœnix	United Kingdom	The ship was wrecked on Bornholm, Denmark. She was on a voyage from Riga to Aberdeen.
Princess of Wales	United Kingdom	The ship foundered in the Atlantic Ocean off Lisbon, Portugal. Her crew were rescued.
Quebec Packet	United Kingdom	The ship was driven ashore near the mouth of the Humber. She was refloated on 6 January 1806 and taken in to Hull.
Raphaelo	United Kingdom	The ship was wrecked near Pillau, Prussia with the loss of all hands. She was on a voyage from Riga to Portsmouth, Hampshire.
Rover	United Kingdom	The ship departed from Youghal, County Cork, for London. No further trace, presumed foundered with the loss of all hands.
Ruby	United Kingdom	The ship was wrecked at Dagerort, Russia while on a voyage from Saint Petersburg, Russia to London.
Sisters	United Kingdom	The ship was driven ashore on Saltholm, Denmark. She was on a voyage from Narva to Liverpool. Sisters was later refloated.
Sophia	United Kingdom	The crewless ship was taken in The Downs. She was on a voyage from Poole, Dorset to Hull.
St. Andre or St. Andreas	Sweden	The galiot foundered in the Bay of St. Brieux. Her crew were rescued. She was on a voyage from Guernsey, Channel Islands, to Lisbon.
Theseus	United Kingdom	The transport ship ran aground on the Oars Sandbank, off the coast of Hampshire.
Traveller	United Kingdom	The ship foundered off Livorno, Grand Duchy of Tuscany. She was on a voyage from Poole, Dorset, to Livorno.
Triumph	Bremen	The hoy was driven ashore on the Isle of Wight. She was on a voyage from Bordeaux, Gironde, France to Bremen.
Vigilant	United Kingdom	The ship was wrecked on the Fairness Rock, off Margate. She was on a voyage from Cardiffe, Glamorgan to London.
William	United Kingdom	The ship was driven ashore and wrecked at Weymouth, Dorset.
Zealous	United Kingdom	The ship was struck rocks on Mount Batten, Plymouth, Devon and sank. She was on a voyage from Great Yarmouth to Liverpool.

== Unknown date ==
List of shipwrecks: Unknown date in 1805
Ship	State	Description
Ann Maria	United States	The ship was driven ashore and wrecked at Barnegat, New Jersey. She was on a voyage from New York to Savannah, Georgia.
Bridgewater	United Kingdom	The British East India Company full-rigged ship departed Bombay bound for England and was never heard from again.
British Queen	United Kingdom	The ship was lost in the Bay of Fundy. She was on a voyage from Jamaica to Saint John, New Brunswick, British North America.
Boreas	United Kingdom	The ship departed from Quebec City, Lower Canada, British North America for a British port at the end of October or in early November. No further trace, presumed foundered in the Atlantic Ocean with the loss of all hands.
Brothers	United Kingdom	The ship was driven ashore and wrecked on Squan Beach, Manasquan, New Jersey, United States.
Burnaby	United Kingdom	War of the Third Coalition: The ship was run ashore at Vizagapatam, India to prevent her capture.
Catherine	United Kingdom	The brig foundered in the Indian Ocean off Point Calimere. Her crew were rescued by HMS Sheerness (Royal Navy)
Catherine	United Kingdom	The ship foundered. She was on a voyage from Nevis to London.
Chesterfield	United Kingdom	War of the Third Coalition: The ship was captured off Jamaica. She was subsequently recaptured and sunk. Chesterfield was on a voyage from London to Jamaica.
China	United States	The ship was wrecked on the coast of Delaware, United States. She was on a voyage from Batavia, Dutch East Indies to Philadelphia, Pennsylvania.
Christiana	Hamburg	The ship ran aground Nash Point, Glamorgan, United Kingdom with the loss of five of her seventeen crew. She was on a voyage from Hamburg to Bristol, Gloucestershire, United Kingdom. Christiana was later refloated.
Conceicão	Spain	The ship was wrecked near Ayamonte. She was on a voyage from Norfolk, Virginia, United States to Cádiz.
Diana	United Kingdom	The ship was wrecked on the Main Reef, 40 nautical miles (74 km) off the coast of Belize.
Diana	United Kingdom	The ship was lost in the West Indies. She was on a voyage from Barbados to London.
Dolphin	(United Kingdom of Great Britain and Ireland) Barbados	The schooner was lost off Saint Lucie.
Eleanor	United Kingdom	The ship was lost at Newfoundland, British North America.
Eliza	United Kingdom	The ship was captured by a privateer and was run ashore. She was on a voyage from Jamaica to Virginia.
Elizabeth	United Kingdom	The ship foundered in the Grand Banks of Newfoundland while on a voyage from New York. United States to Liverpool. There were 13 survivors.
Endeavour	United Kingdom	The ship was lost at Newfoundland.
Fanny	United States	The ship was lost in the Delaware River. She was on a voyage from the Île de France. Mauritius to Philadelphia, Pennsylvania.
Fanny	United Kingdom	The ship foundered. She was on a voyage from Saint Lucia to Bristol, Gloucestershire.
Fortuna	Prussia	The ship was driven ashore at Cape Hatteras, North Carolina, United States. She was on a voyage from Varel to Baltimore, Maryland, United States.
George	United Kingdom	War of the Third Coalition: The ship was driven ashore at Manchioneal, Jamaica, by a privateer.
Hoffnung	Flag unknown	The ship foundered. Her crew were rescued. She was on a voyage from Lisbon, Portugal to Caen, Calvados, France.
Independence	(United Kingdom of Great Britain and Ireland) New South Wales	The schooner was lost on a voyage from Sydney, New South Wales. She had departed around May 1805.
Jack Park	United Kingdom	The ship was driven ashore at Charleston, South Carolina, United States.
Janus	United States	The ship was abandoned at sea. She was on a voyage from the Turks Islands to Virginia.
John	United Kingdom	The ship was wrecked in the Bahamas.
Lion	United States	The ship foundered in the Atlantic Ocean while on a voyage from New York to Bordeaux, Basses-Pyrénées, France. There were seven survivors.
Little Edward	United Kingdom	The ship was abandoned in the Atlantic Ocean. She was on a voyage from Liverpool to Newfoundland.
Maria	United Kingdom	The ship was lost on the "John-a-Mains" with the loss of two of her crew.
Maria	United Kingdom	The whaler was lost off the coast of Greenland.
Maria	United Kingdom	The ship was wrecked near Ferryland, Newfoundland. She was on a voyage from Dartmouth, Devon, to Newfoundland.
Mary Ann or Maryann	United Kingdom	The ship was wrecked on the coast of Africa. Her crew were resucued. She was on a voyage from Africa to the West Indies.
Maryland	United States	The ship was driven ashore and wrecked at Egg Harbor City, New Jersey. She was on a voyage from India to an American port.
Mellish	United Kingdom	The whaler was destroyed by fire in the Davis Strait. Her crew were rescued.
Minerva	United Kingdom	The ship was lost in the Plantain Garden River, Jamaica. She was on a voyage from Jamaica to Boston.
Nero	United Kingdom	The ship sprang a leak in the Atlantic Ocean while on a voyage from Jamaica to London. She was abandoned by her crew and set afire.
Ocean	United Kingdom	The ship was lost near Tortola, Virgin Islands, before 3 December. She was on a voyage from Saint Vincent to Bristol, Gloucestershire.
Paget	United Kingdom	The ship was driven ashore at "Cape Antonio". She was on a voyage from Jamaica to London.
Pallas	United Kingdom	The ship sprang a leak and was abandoned by her crew. She was on a voyage from Gibraltar to New York.
Plutus	Bremen	The ship foundered while on a voyage from Saint Thomas, Virgin Islands to Emden, East Frisia. Her crew were rescued by the whaler Harriot (United Kingdom).
Providence	United Kingdom	The ship foundered. She was on a voyage from Nevis to London.
Recovery	United Kingdom	The brig was driven ashore and wrecked at Sandy Hook, New Jersey, United States.
Recovery	United Kingdom	The ship was driven ashore at Quebec City.
Rosalia	United Kingdom	The ship ran aground on a reef in Tyrrel's Bay, Tobago and was wrecked.
Rose	United Kingdom	The ship was wrecked at Demerara. She was on a voyage from Surinam to London.
Ruby	United Kingdom	The ship was wrecked in the Bahamas.
Sally	United Kingdom	The ship was on a slave trading voyage from Liverpool to Africa when she put into Barbados dis-masted. There she was condemned.
Shepherdess	United States	The ship was driven ashore near New York. She was on a voyage from Bordeaux, Basses-Pyrénées, France to New York.
Sorrana	Prussia	The ship was lost in the Strait of Sunda. She was on a voyage from Batavia to Emden.
Spring	United Kingdom	The ship was lost on the Sable Island, Nova Scotia. Her crew were rescued. She was on a voyage from Poole, Dorset, to New York.
Svarhalt	Denmark-Norway	The ship foundered while on a voyage from Santa Cruz to Copenhagen. Her crew were rescued by Maria (United Kingdom.
Thomas	United Kingdom	The ship sprang a leak in the Atlantic Ocean while on a voyage from Jamaica to Liverpool. She was abandoned by her crew and set afire.
Thorley	United Kingdom	The ship was wrecked at Jamaica Her crew were rescued. She was on a voyage from Newcastle upon Tyne, Northumberland to Jamaica.
Tiger	United Kingdom	The ship was driven ashore. She was later refloated and put into Savannah-la-Mar, Jamaica. Tiger was on a voyage from Jamaivca to Liverpool.
Volunteer	United Kingdom	The ship foundered while on a voyage from Jamaica to London. Her crew were rescued by the brig Raccoon (United Kingdom).
William	United Kingdom	The ship was lost at Plantain Garden, Jamaica.
Zephyr	United States	The ship was wrecked on Grand Caicos. She was on a voyage from Virginia to Jamaica.
