= French frigate Armide (1804) =

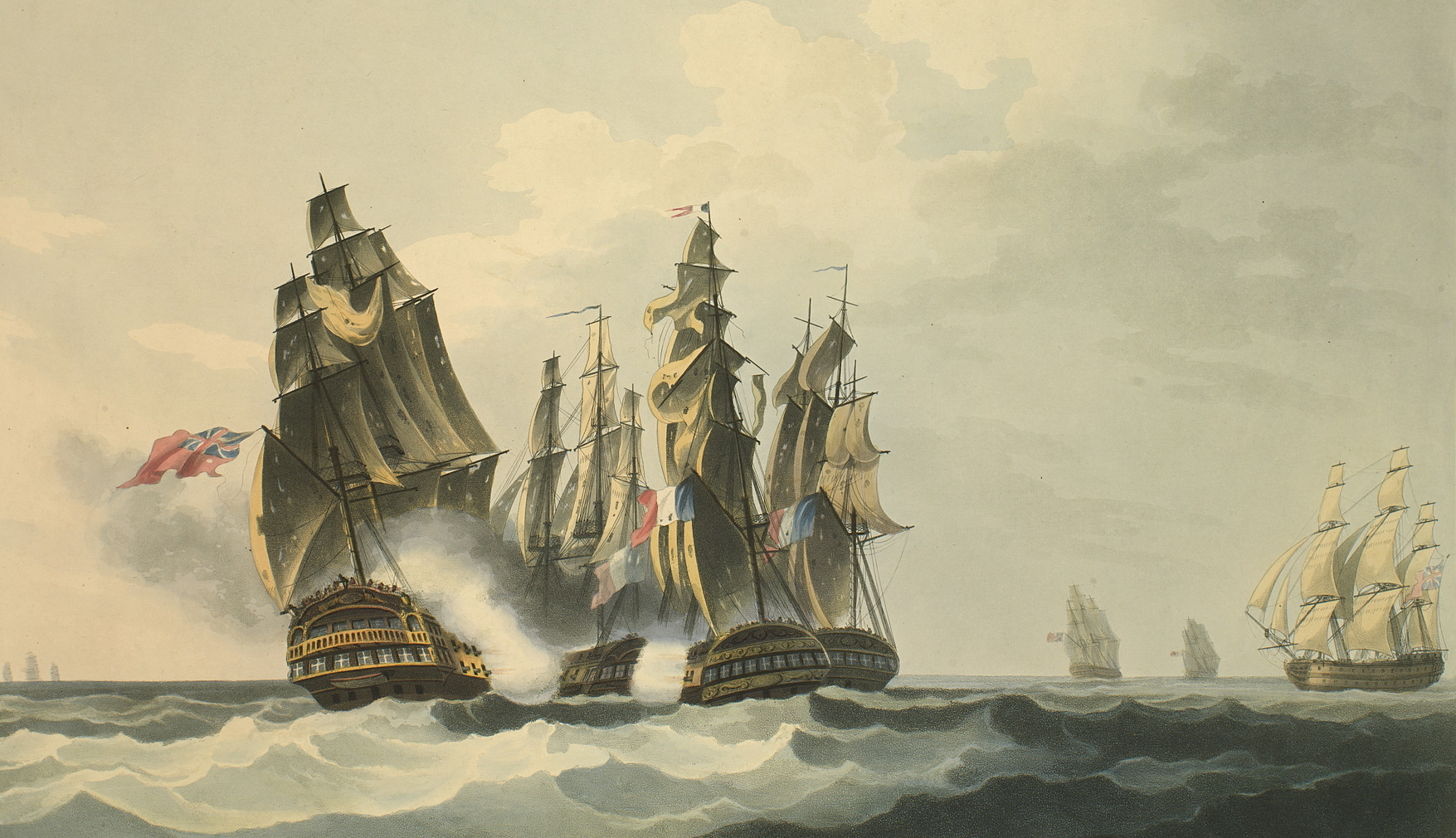
- Armide (third from left) at the action of 25 September 1806

History

France
- Name: Armide
- Namesake: Armida
- Builder: Rochefort
- Laid down: November 1802
- Launched: 24 April 1804
- Commissioned: 1804
- Captured: 1806

United Kingdom
- Name: Armide
- Stricken: 1815
- Fate: Broken up

General characteristics
- Class & type: Armide-class frigate
- Displacement: 1430 tonneaux
- Tons burthen: 759 port tonneaux; 1,10430/94 (bm)
- Length: 47 m (154 ft 2 in)
- Beam: 12 m (39 ft 4 in)
- Draught: 5.5 m (18 ft 1 in)
- Propulsion: Sail
- Complement: French service: 339; British service: 284; later 315
- Armament: French service; 28 × 18-pounder long guns; 8 × 8-pounders; 8 × 36-pounder carronades; British service; UD: 28 × 18-pounder guns; QD: 14 × 32-pounder carronades; Fc: 2 × 9-pounder guns; 2 × 32-pounder carronades

Armide was a 40-gun frigate of the French Navy, the lead ship of her class and was launched in 1804 at Rochefort. She served briefly in the French Navy before the Royal Navy captured her in 1806. She served in the Royal Navy until 1815, when she was broken up.

== French service ==
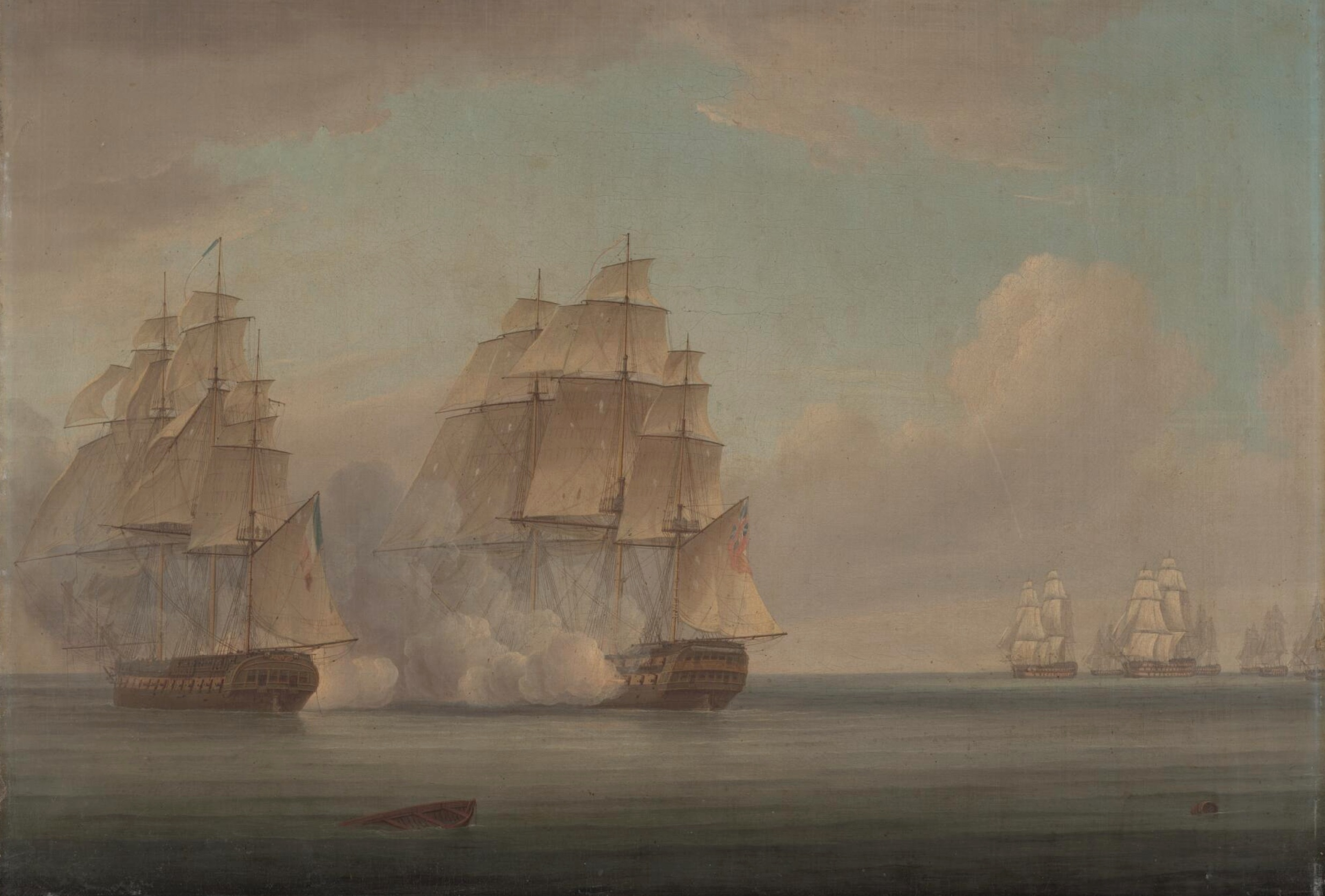
Armide (left) engaging Calcutta at the action of 26 September 1805

Armide took part in Allemand's expedition of 1805. On 18 July, she captured and burned a Prussian cutter to maintain the secrecy of the fleet's movement, despite Prussia's neutrality at the time. The next day, she captured and burned HMS Ranger. She then took part in the assault on the Calcutta convoy, helping Magnanime engage and capture HMS Calcutta.

In March 1806, under Amable Troude, Armide helped repel an attack led by Robert Stopford at Les Sables-d'Olonne.

=== Capture ===
During the action of 25 September 1806, HMS Centaur, under the command of Commodore Sir Samuel Hood, captured Armide, which was under the command of Captain Jean-Jacques-Jude Langlois, and assisted in the capture of Infatigable, Gloire and Minerve. Centaur lost three men killed and three wounded. In addition, a musket ball shattered Hood's arm, which had to be amputated. The wound forced Hood to quit the deck and leave the ship in the charge of Lieutenant William Case. Centaur also lost most of her lower rigging. In all, the British lost nine men killed and 32 wounded. Hood estimated that the French had 650 men aboard each vessel, including soldiers, but put off any estimate of their losses until later.

Armide arrived at Plymouth on 2 October 1806, where she was laid up. In 1807 and 1808, she was in ordinary in Plymouth. She then underwent repairs between February and October 1809.

== British service ==
Armide entered British service as the 38-gun fifth-rate HMS Armide. In August 1809, Captain Lucius Ferdinand Hardyman commissioned her and assumed command.

=== Napoleonic Wars ===
In January 1810, Armide, under Captain Hardyman, and the 80-gun second rate, HMS Christian VII, Captain Sir Joseph Sydney Yorke, were stationed off the Basque Roads. On 10 January, they sighted a small convoy sailing from the Île d'Aix to La Rochelle. The boats of the two ships went in under small arms and grapeshot fire from a shore battery and captured a chasse-maree of about 30 tons. The tide was ebbing too fast to bring off the other vessels, so the British burnt a brig, a schooner and a chasse-maree. This was regrettable as they were all fully laden with cargoes consisting of best quality wines and brandies, soap, rosin, candles, pitch, oil, pine varnish, and the like. The cutting-out expedition suffered no casualties. The captured chasse maree was probably the Felicite.

On 19 January, Armide recaptured the brig Hope. The next evening, boats from Armide and Christian VII pursued about 30 vessels coming out from the Maumusson Pass, between the Île d'Oléron and the mainland, making for La Rochelle. The French convoy then ran aground close to shore batteries. Still, the British could take one chasse-maree and burn four, despite heavy fire from the shore batteries. The rest escaped and headed back to where they had come. Two French sailors died in the affair, and Armide had one man wounded. The captured chasse maree was probably Glorieuse.

On the night of 12 February, another convoy of ten vessels sailed from the river Charente, and three chasse-marées went aground on the reef off the Point de Chatelaillon between La Rochelle and Île d'Aix. Yorke then sent three boats from Armide and Christian VII, plus two from HMS Seine, to attack them. Nine French gunboats, each carrying a 12-pounder carronade and six swivel guns, and manned with sufficient men for 20 to 30 oars, fled from the British boats. The British, led by Lt. Gardiner Henry Guion, captured one gunboat, killing two of her crew and wounding three, including her commander; two gunboats grounded and could not be retrieved. The British then burnt the three chasse-marees that they had captured.

On 29 April, Armide was in company with Daring when they captured the Aimable Betsie. Monkey and the hired armed cutter Adrian also shared information about the proceeds of the capture of Aimable Betzie.

On 4 May, boats from Armide, with the assistance of boats from the 8-gun Cherokee-class brig-sloop Cadmus, and the gun-brigs Monkey and Daring, attacked a French convoy of armed and coasting vessels off the Île de Ré. Despite intense fire from shore batteries and the convoy's escorts, the British captured and burned 13 vessels and forced four ashore. Armide lost three men killed and three wounded.

In August, Captain Richard Dalling Dun assumed command. On 27 September, the boats of the 120-gun first rate HMS Caledonia, Captain Sir Harry Neale, the 74-gun Repulse-class third rate HMS Valiant, Captain Robert Dudley Oliver, and Armide captured two laden brigs and burned a third that had taken shelter under the guns of a battery on the Point du Ché, near Angoulins. A force of 130 Royal Marines from the two ships of the line also took and destroyed the battery after engaging reinforcements on the way. The British suffered two men wounded, but killed at least 14 French soldiers in the battery alone. The next day, Armide, Caledonia, Valiant, Snapper, Arrow and the hired armed cutter Nimrod captured the San Nicolas and Aventura.

On 9 January 1811, Armide and Pheasant recaptured the Nancy.

Captain Francis Temple assumed command in September 1812. On 10 December, Armide was in company with Piercer and so shared in the prize money from the capture of the chasse maree Civilité. Armide was in sight on 23 December when the hired armed cutter Nimrod recaptured Sparkler, and so shared in the salvage money.

On 16 January 1813, Armide grounded near two batteries on Point St. Jaques, Quiberon Bay. When the French hailed them, the pilot on Armide replied that she was the frigate USS President and that they required no assistance. Her crew managed to re-float Armide before the French discovered they had been tricked. Still, a court-martial reprimanded Temple, "disrated the master from his ship," and fined the pilot all his pay, sentencing him to imprisonment in the Marshalsea for two months.

=== War of 1812 ===
From 5 February 1813 to May 1815, Armide was under the command of Captain Edward Thomas Troubridge. On 14 May, he brought her into Nova Scotia with a convoy of three store ships from Cork. On 7 August 1813, Armide captured an American schooner laden with munitions of war on the Rappahannock River at Windmill Point and with two ladies as passengers. Armide forwarded the ladies to their place of destination but kept their two male escorts and three sailors as prisoners.

On 15 August, Armide was in company with Endymion and Pique when she captured the American privateer Herald of 230 tons burthen (bm), 17 guns and 100 men. She had thrown two guns overboard while pursued. The next day, Armide captured the French letter of marque Invincible, formerly Invincible Napoleon. She was armed with 16 guns but had thrown ten overboard. She was of 331 tons burthen (bm) and had a crew of 60 men. Little Belt was an American sloop of 18 tons (bm) and 3 men, sailing from New York to Charleston, that HMS Armide destroyed on 26 September off "the Capes" after taking off Little Belt's cargo.

To prepare for the attack on New Orleans, in early December 1814, Vice Admiral Sir Alexander Cochrane hoisted his flag in Armide and took her together with the 38-gun frigate HMS Seahorse and the 18-gun Cruizer-class brig-sloop HMS Sophie off Pensacola to an anchorage at the Isle of Vaisseau at the beginning of December 1814. On her way down, two American gunboats fired on Armide, which led to the Battle of Lake Borgne. Boats from the British fleet, under Captain Nicholas Lockyer of Sophie, and including Armide, captured the American gunboat flotilla. In this boat action, British casualties were 17 men killed, including one from Armide, and 77 wounded. In 1847, the Admiralty issued a clasp (or bar) marked "14 Dec. Boat Service 1814" to survivors of the boat service who claimed the clasp to the Naval General Service Medal. (Note: The 'Names of Ships for which Claims have been proved' are as follows: warships Tonnant, Norge, Royal Oak, Ramillies, Bedford, Armide, Cydnus, Trave, Seahorse, Sophie, and Meteor; troopships Gorgon, Diomede, Alceste, and Belle Poule.)

After the British had succeeded in silencing American naval opposition, the British transported their troops 60 miles to Bayou Catalan (or des Pecheurs) at the head of Lake Borgne. The troops landed on 23 December and took a position across the main road to New Orleans. While Captain Troubridge took command of the naval brigade ashore, Armide remained anchored off Cat Island (Mississippi). The British withdrew after their defeat in the Battle of New Orleans in January 1815. Cochrane left the British headquarters on 14 January, returning to Armide on the 16th. (Note: Cochrane spent a month on shore, as explained in his despatch to the Admiralty, written aboard the Armide dated 18 January 1815. 'Upon the 16th therefore the advance, commanded by Colonel Thornton... took post upon the Isle aux Poix, a small swampy spot at the mouth of the Pearl river, about thirty miles from the anchorage... where Major-General Keane, Rear-Admiral Codrington, and myself joined them on the following day [17 Dec 1814].... This arrangement [for withdrawal] being in a forward state of execution, I quitted head quarters on the 14th instant, leaving Rear-Admiral Malcolm to conduct the naval part of the operations in that quarter, and I arrived at this anchorage on the 16th [January], where I am arranging for the reception of the army, and preparing the fleet for further operations.' Reproduced in the London Gazette. "No. 16991". The London Gazette. 9 March 1815. pp. 449–451.)

== Fate ==
In February, Armide was at Bermuda, ready for passage home. She was broken up in November 1815.
