= Sercombe =

Sercombe is a surname. Notable people with the surname include:

- Bob Sercombe (1949–2025), Australian politician
- Liam Sercombe (born 1990), English footballer
- Thomas Sercombe Smith (1858–1937), British civil servant and judge

== See also ==
- Seccombe
