= French frigate Infatigable =

History

France
- Name: Infatigable
- Builder: Le Havre (Construteur:Charles-Henri Tellier)
- Laid down: 19 July 1797
- Launched: 6 April 1799
- Commissioned: March 1800
- Captured: 25 September 1806

United Kingdom
- Name: Immortalite
- Acquired: 25 September 1806 (by capture)
- Commissioned: 23 September 1801
- Fate: Scrapped, 1811

General characteristics
- Type: Frigate
- Displacement: 1341 tonneaux
- Tons burthen: 712-759 port tonneaux
- Length: 47.75 m (156.7 ft) (overall); 42.22 m (138.5 ft)
- Beam: 12.07 m (39.6 ft)
- Complement: 340 (war); 260 (peace)
- Armament: French service; Upper deck: 28 × 18-livre; QD and Fc: 12 × 8-livre + 4 × 36-livre obusiers; British service: Not re-armed

Infatigable was a 40-gun Valeureuse-class frigate of the French Navy, launched at Le Havre in 1799. She took part in Allemand's expedition of 1805. The British Royal Navy captured her in 1806. She was taken into the Royal Navy but never used and she was broken up in 1811.

== French career ==
Infatigable was under the command of capitaine de vaiseau Meynne between 22 October 1801 and 26 December 1802. First she sailed from Havre to Cherbourg. Then she carried troops from Cherbourg to Cap-Français via Douvres, Dunkirk, and Flessingue. From Cap-Français she conducted a mission to Havana, from which she returned to Cap-Français before sailing back to Brest.

Around 31 July 1803 capitaine de vaisseau Troude brought the colonial prefect (governor) of "Aure" and passengers from Cap-Français back to Lorient.

A French squadron consisting of Actæon, Armide, Gloire, Infatigable, Jemmapes, Lion, Lynx and Magnanime burnt the sloop Eclipse, Lady Nelson, Matthew, Thetis, and Thomas in an attack at Saint Kitts. The same squadron burnt the Lady Jane Halliday, the Nelly, and the Themis at Nevis.

Between 11 and 20 November 1805, Infatigable, under the command of capitaine de vaisseau Joseph-Maurice Girardias, was in Île-d'Aix roads.

== Capture ==
A four-ship squadron of the Royal Navy under Samuel Hood captured her in the action of 25 September 1806, together with Gloire, Minerve and Armide after they had left Rochefort the evening before. Infatigable was under the command of capitaine de vaisseau "Giradiers". French casualties were heavy as the French squadron was carrying troops.

== Fate ==
The Royal Navy took her into service as HMS Immortalite but never used her. She was broken up in 1811.
