= Duke of Clarence (1800 ship) =

History
- Name: Duke of Clarence
- Namesake: Duke of Clarence
- Owner: 1802:Ingram (Note: Richard Butler, Francis Ingram, William Ingram, and James Rigby.); 1805:Humble & Co.
- Builder: Plymouth
- Launched: 1800
- Fate: Foundered June 1805

General characteristics
- Tons burthen: 180 (bm)
- Propulsion: Sail
- Complement: 35
- Armament: 2 × 6-pounder guns + 12 × 12-pounder carronades

Duke of Clarence was launched at Plymouth in 1800. She made one voyage as a slave ship. She foundered in 1805 on her first voyage as a whaler.

== Career ==
Although Duke of Clarence was launched at Plymouth in 1800, she first appeared in the Register of Shipping in 1802. At that time, she was based in Liverpool, and preparing to embark on a slave trading voyage.

Year	Master	Owner	Trade
1802	M'Clune	Ingram	Liverpool—Africa
1804	M'Clune	Ingram	Liverpool—Africa

In 1803 Captain John M'Clune sailed on a slave-trading voyage. Duke of Clarence left Liverpool on 4 August 1802. She arrived at Trinidad on 12 May 1803 with 191 slaves. She left Trinidad on 30 June, and arrived back at Liverpool on 11 August. She had departed Liverpool with 22 crew members and she suffered three crew deaths on the voyage.

Year	Master	Owner	Trade
1805	M'Clune	Ingram	Liverpool—Africa
1806	Killiner	Humble & Co.	Liverpool—South Seas

Captain Henry Killiner acquired a letter of marque on 11 January 1805. Lloyd's List reported on 25 January that the privateer Duke of Clarence had gone ashore at Secombe, and was much damaged.

However, in February Killiner sailed Duke of Clarence to engage in whaling on the Brazil Banks.

== Fate ==
Duke of Clarence foundered on 5 June 1805 in the River Plate. One of the crew drowned.
