= Seccombe =

Seccombe or Secombe is a surname. Notable people with the surname include:

== Seccombe ==
- Alf Seccombe (born 1982), American filmmaker
- Don Seccombe (born 1942), Australian cricketer
- Don Seccombe (television presenter) (1931–1993), Australian television presenter
- James Seccombe (1893–1970), American politician
- Joan Seccombe, Baroness Seccombe (born 1930), British peer
- John Seccombe (1708–1792), Canadian minister and poet
- John Thomas Seccombe (1834–1895), English doctor
- Mike Seccombe, Australian journalist
- Pauline Seccombe, maiden name of Pauline Hanson (born 1954), Australian politician
- Philip Seccombe (born 1951), British politician
- Roger Seccombe (1940–2018), Australian filmmaker
- Thomas Seccombe (1866–1923), English writer
- Victor Secombe (1897–1962), Australian general
- Wade Seccombe (born 1971), Australian cricketer

== Secombe ==
- Andy Secombe (born 1953), Welsh actor and author
- David A. Secombe (1827–1892), American lawyer and politician
- Fred Secombe (born 1918), Welsh priest
- Harry Secombe (1921–2001), Welsh comedian and singer

== See also ==
- 17166 Secombe, a main-belt asteroid (named for Harry Secombe)
- Seacombe, a district of the town of Wallasey, on the Wirral Peninsula, England
- Secombe Theatre, a theatre in London, UK (named for Harry Secombe)
