= Roger Seccombe =

Australian documentary filmmaker (1940-2018)

- Born: Roger Howard Seccombe; 1940
- Died: 2018 (aged 77–78)
- Occupation: filmmaker

Roger Howard Seccombe (1940 – 2018) was an Australian filmmaker who directed and photographed films on scientific subjects independently and for the CSIRO during the 1970s and 1980s. His films include What to do about CO2? (1975), The Living Soil (1982), Qem*Sem (1982), Tails from the Islands (1986) and Mysteries of the Leeuwin (1988).

Seccombe lived in Victoria and was a published cinema enthusiast.
