= French frigate Gloire (1803) =

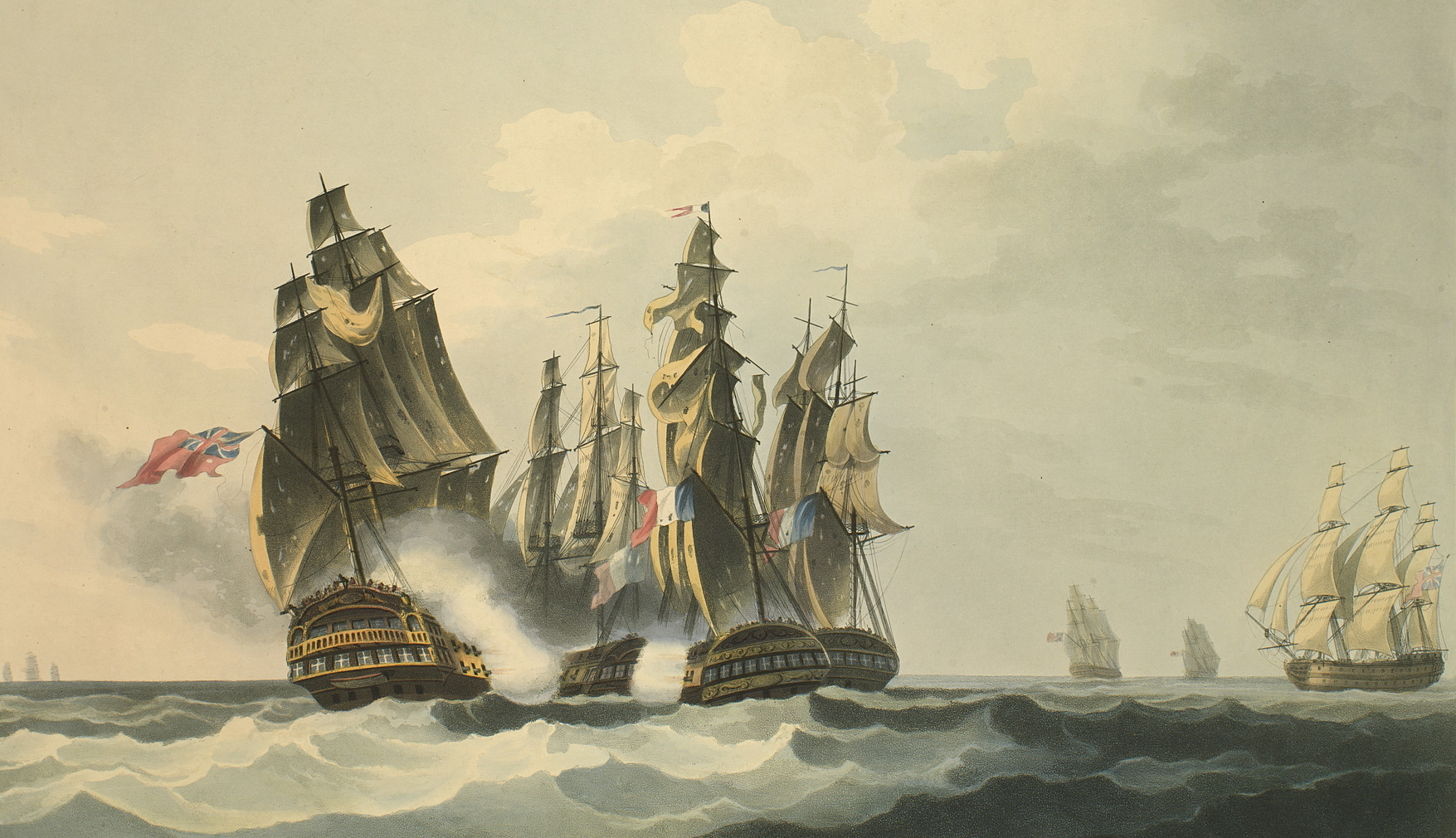
- Gloire (fourth from left) at the action of 25 September 1806

History

France
- Name: Gloire
- Namesake: Glory
- Launched: 20 July 1803
- Captured: 25 September 1806

United Kingdom
- Name: Gloire
- Acquired: 25 September 1806
- Fate: Scrapped, 1812

General characteristics
Type	Frigate
Tons burthen	1148 bm
Length	46 metres (151 ft)
Beam	12 metres (39 ft)
Draught	7 metres (23 ft)
Complement	330 men
Armament	40 guns: Battery: 28 × 18-pounder long guns; Quarterdeck and forecastle: 12 × 8-pounder long guns
Armour	Timber

Gloire was a 44-gun frigate of the French Navy, lead ship of her class.

She took part in Allemand's expedition of 1805. On 18 July, she captured and burnt a Prussian cutter to maintain the secrecy of the movements of the fleet, in spite of the neutrality of Prussia at the time. The next day, along with Armide, she captured HMS Ranger and burnt her.

In the action of 25 September 1806, Armide, Gloire, Minerve and Infatigable were captured by a four-ship squadron under Samuel Hood.

She was brought into British service as HMS Gloire and broken up in 1812.
