= Seine-class frigate =

42-gun frigates of the French Navy

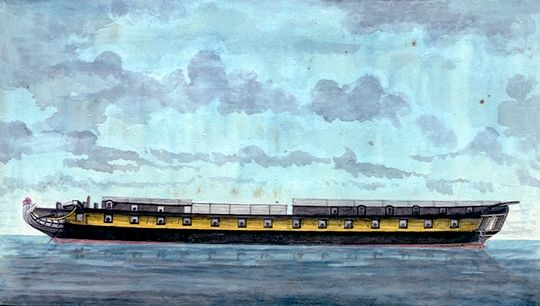
- Hull of HMS Revolutionnaire

Class overview
- Name: Seine
- Builders: Le Havre (4); Cherbourg (1)
- Operators: French Navy; Royal Navy
- Preceded by: Minerve class
- Succeeded by: Virginie class
- Subclasses: Valeureuse class
- Planned: 6
- Completed: 7

General characteristics
- Type: Frigate
- Displacement: 1311 tonneaux
- Tons burthen: 700 port tonneaux
- Length: 146 ft 4 in (44.60 m)
- Beam: 37 ft 2 in (11.33 m)
- Depth of hold: 18 ft (5.5 m)
- Armament: 42 guns:
- Armour: Timber

The Seine class was a class of four 42-gun frigates of the French Navy, designed in 1793 by Pierre-Alexandre Forfait. A fifth vessel, Furieuse, was originally ordered at Cherbourg in February 1794 to Forfait's Romaine-class design, but was instead completed to the design of the Seine class.

The ship builder Charles-Henri Le Tellier produced a variant of the Forfait design after the latter went to Venice in 1797. Two further vessels, originally ordered as the final pair to the Seine design and begun to that design in July 1797, were completed to the variant design as the Valeureuse class, which were about 8 inches (20 cm) longer than earlier Seine-class vessels.

The vessels were originally designed to carry a main armament of 24-pounder guns, but in the event all were completed at Le Havre with 18-pounders.

== Seine class ==
- Seine

Builder: Le Havre
Begun: May 1793
Launched: 19 December 1793
Completed: March 1794
Fate: Captured by the Royal Navy on 30 June 1798, becoming HMS Seine.

- Révolutionnaire

Builder: Le Havre
Begun: October 1793
Launched: 28 May 1794
Completed: July 1794
Fate: Captured by the Royal Navy on 21 October 1794, becoming HMS Revolutionnaire.

- Spartiate

Builder: Le Havre
Begun: May 1794
Launched: late November 1794
Completed: December 1794
Fate: Renamed La Pensée May 1795. Converted to a breakwater in November 1804, deleted 1832.

- Indienne

Builder: Le Havre
Begun: December 1794
Launched: 2 September 1796
Completed: October 1797
Fate: Burnt to avoid capture by the Royal Navy in April 1809.

- Furieuse

Builder: Cherbourg
Begun: March 1795
Launched: 22 September 1797
Completed: May 1798
Fate: Captured by the Royal Navy on 6 July 1809, becoming HMS Furieuse.

== Valeureuse class ==
- Valeureuse

Builder: Le Havre
Begun: July 1797
Launched: 29 July 1798
Completed: March 1800
Fate: Sold in September 1806 at Marcus Hook, Pennsylvania for breaking up following condemnation as irreparable at Philadelphia.

- Infatigable

Builder: Le Havre
Begun: July 1797
Launched: 6 April 1799
Completed: March 1800
Fate: Captured by the Royal Navy on 24 September 1806, becoming HMS Immortalité; never commissioned and sold in January 1811 at Plymouth for breaking up.
