= Queen Charlotte (1799 ship) =

History

Great Britain
- Name: Queen Charlotte
- Acquired: 1799 by purchase of a prize
- Fate: Burnt

General characteristics
- Tons burthen: 450, or 451 (bm)
- Complement: 1793: 54; 1799: 42; 1800: 40; 1801: 40
- Armament: 1793: 10 × 6-pounder guns; 1799: 22 × 6&9&12-pounder guns; 1800: 22 × 6&9&12-pounder guns; 1800: 16 × 12-pounder + 4 × 9-pounder + 2 × 6-pounder guns; 1801: 22 × 6&9&12-pounder guns

Queen Charlotte was a French prize that first appeared in British on-line records in 1799. She was a West Indiaman. She was burnt in 1805.

== Career ==
Queen Charlotte first appeared in Lloyd's Register (LR) in 1799.

Year	Master	Owner	Trade	Source & notes
1799	J.Pollock	Butler	London–Jamaica	LR
1800	J.Pollock; W.Dalton	F.Baring	London–Jamaica	LR; almost rebuilt 1799
1801	W.Dalton; P.Clark	F.Baring	London–Surinam	LR; almost rebuilt 1799
1805	P.Clark	F.Baring	London–Suriname	LR; almost rebuilt 1799

- Captain John Pollock acquired a letter of marque on 24 August 1799.
- Captain William Dalton acquired a letter of marque on 17 September 1800.
- Captain Peter Clark acquired a letter of marque on 5 May 1805.

In March 1805 Queen Charlotte was reported off "Scicily" (Isles of Scilly). She was returning from Suriname. She was leaky and her cargo had been damaged.

== Fate ==
Queen Charlotte was burnt off Dungeness on 2 April 1805.
