= French ship Jemmapes (1794) =

Ship of the line of the French Navy

- Scale model of Achille, sister ship of French ship Jemmapes (1794), on display at the Musée national de la Marine in Paris.

History

France
- Name: Jemmapes
- Namesake: Battle of Jemappes
- Ordered: 19 October 1787
- Builder: Arsenal de Rochefort
- Laid down: August 1790
- Launched: 22 January 1794
- Commissioned: March 1794
- Decommissioned: May 1820
- Fate: Broken up, 1830

General characteristics
- Class & type: Téméraire-class ship of the line
- Displacement: 3,069 tonneaux
- Tons burthen: 1,537 port tonneaux
- Length: 55.87 m (183 ft 4 in)
- Beam: 14.46 m (47 ft 5 in)
- Draught: 7.15 m (23.5 ft)
- Depth of hold: 7.15 m (23 ft 5 in)
- Sail plan: Full-rigged ship
- Crew: 705
- Armament: 74 guns: Lower gun deck: 28 × 36 pdr guns; Upper gun deck: 30 × 18 pdr guns; Forecastle and Quarterdeck: 16 × 8 pdr guns

Jemmapes was a 74-gun Téméraire-class ship of the line built for the French Navy during the 1780s. Completed in 1794, she played a minor role in the Napoleonic Wars.

== Description ==
The Téméraire-class ships had a length of 55.87 metres (183 ft 4 in), a beam of 14.46 metres (47 ft 5 in) and a depth of hold of 7.15 metres (23 ft 5 in). The ships displaced 3,069 tonneaux and had a mean draught of 7.15 metres (23 ft 5 in). They had a tonnage of 1,537 port tonneaux. Their crew numbered 705 officers and ratings during wartime. They were fitted with three masts and ship rigged.

The muzzle-loading, smoothbore armament of the Téméraire class consisted of twenty-eight 36-pounder long guns on the lower gun deck, thirty 18-pounder long guns and thirty 18-pounder long guns on the upper gun deck. On the quarterdeck and forecastle were a total of sixteen 8-pounder long guns. Beginning with the ships completed after 1787, the armament of the Téméraires began to change with the addition of four 36-pounder obusiers on the poop deck (dunette). Some ships had instead twenty 8-pounders.

== Construction and career ==
Jemmapes was ordered on 17 October 1787 and was laid down at the Arsenal de Rochefort in August 1790 as Alexandre. The ship was renamed Jemmapes on 7 January 1793 and launched on 22 January 1794. She completed the following March. Jemappes took part in the Atlantic campaign of May 1794 and in the Glorious First of June. She was dismasted by HMS Queen, with the loss of 60, including her captain, and 55 wounded. The ship took part in the expedition to Saint-Domingue under Julien Cosmao. Jemmapes was part of Zacharie Allemand's "invisible squadron" in 1805, under Captain Jean-Nicolas Petit. She fought at the Battle of the Basque Roads in 1809. The ship was condemned in May 1820 and converted into a hulk in Rochefort the following year.
