= French ship Magnanime (1803) =

Ship of the line of the French Navy

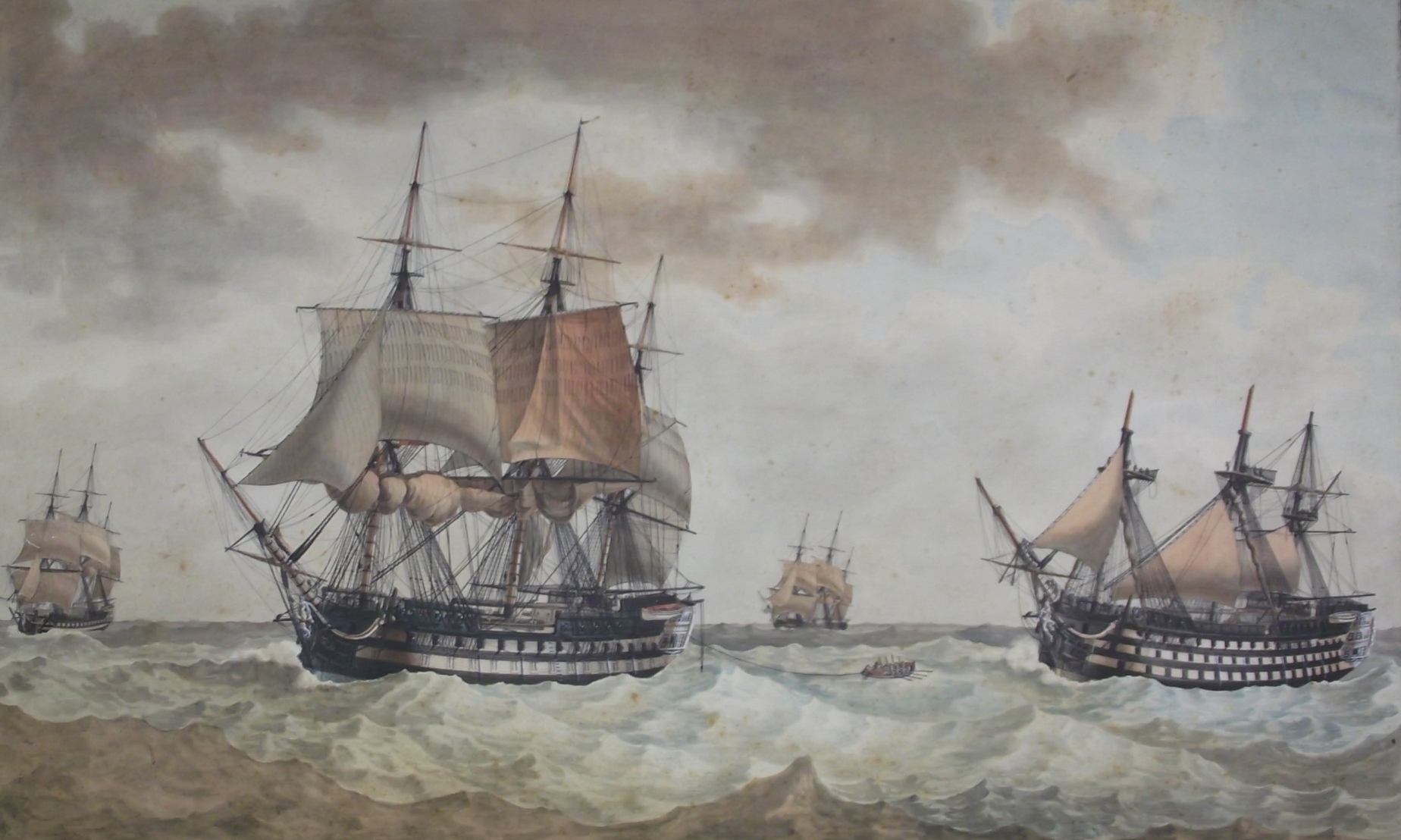
- Magnanime (second from left) towing Commerce de Paris in 1809

History

France
- Name: Magnanime
- Builder: Rochefort
- Laid down: June 1802
- Launched: 18 August 1803
- Decommissioned: 1816
- Fate: Broken up 1820

General characteristics (as built)
- Class & type: Lengthened Téméraire-class ship of the line
- Displacement: 3200 tonneaux
- Tons burthen: 1,600 port tonneaux
- Length: 56.47 m (185 ft 3 in)
- Beam: 14.73 m (48 ft 4 in)
- Draught: 7.47 m (24.5 ft)
- Depth of hold: 7.23 m (23 ft 9 in)
- Sail plan: Full-rigged ship
- Crew: 735
- Armament: 74 guns: Lower gun deck: 28 × 36 pdr guns; Upper gun deck: 30 × 24 pdr guns; Forecastle and Quarterdeck: 16 × 8 pdr guns; 4 × 36 pdr obusiers

Magnanime was a 74-gun lengthened Téméraire-class ship of the line built for the French Navy during the 1790s designed by Jacques-Noël Sané. Completed in 1803, she played a minor role in the Napoleonic Wars.

== Description ==
The lengthened Téméraire-class ships had a length of 56.47 metres (185 ft 3 in), a beam of 14.73 metres (48 ft 4 in) and a depth of hold of 7.23 metres (23 ft 9 in). The ships displaced 3,200 tonneaux and had a mean draught of 7.15 metres (23 ft 5 in). They had a tonnage of 1,600 port tonneaux. Their crew numbered 735 officers and ratings during wartime. They were fitted with three masts and ship rigged.

The muzzle-loading, smoothbore armament of the Lengthened Téméraire class consisted of twenty-eight 36-pounder long guns on the lower gun deck and thirty 24-pounder long guns on the upper gun deck. On the quarterdeck, forecastle and poop deck (dunette) were a total of sixteen 8-pounder long guns and four 36-pounder obusiers.

== Construction and career ==
Magnanime was ordered on 19 June 1794 and was named in October. She was laid down at the Arsenal de Brest on 10 November. The ship was renamed Quattorze Juillet on 7 May 1798 and then Vétéran on 6 December 1802. She was launched on 18 July 1803, commissioned on 24 September and completed in December. During the Atlantic campaign of 1805–1806 the ship was commanded by Captain Jérôme Bonaparte. After her return to France the ship was blockaded in Concarneau, Brittany, until 1811. Vétéran was condemned on 26 October 1833, but was not demolished until November 1841–November 1842.
