= HMS Scout (1804) =

Brig-sloop of the Royal Navy

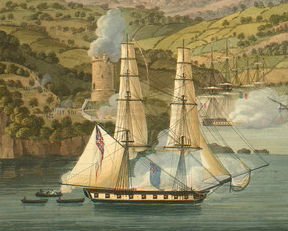
- Scout and the Torra di Sagone in 1811

History

United Kingdom
- Name: HMS Scout
- Ordered: 27 November 1802
- Builder: Peter Atkinson & Co. of Hull
- Laid down: May 1803
- Launched: 7 August 1804
- Honours and awards: Naval General Service Medal with clasp "1 Nov. Boat Service 1809"
- Fate: Sold 11 July 1827

United Kingdom
- Name: Diana
- Owner: Daniel Bennett & Sons
- Acquired: c.1829 by purchase
- Fate: Condemned after an explosion on 26 April 1843

General characteristics
- Type: Cruizer-class brig-sloop
- Tons burthen: 38148/94, or 382, or 398, or 401 (bm)
- Length: 100 ft 0 in (30.5 m) (gundeck); 77 ft 2 1/2 in (23.5 m) (keel)
- Beam: 30 ft 5 3/4 in (9.3 m)
- Depth of hold: 12 ft 9 in (3.9 m)
- Sail plan: Brig rigged
- Complement: 121
- Armament: 16 × 32-pounder carronades + 2 × 6-pounder bow guns

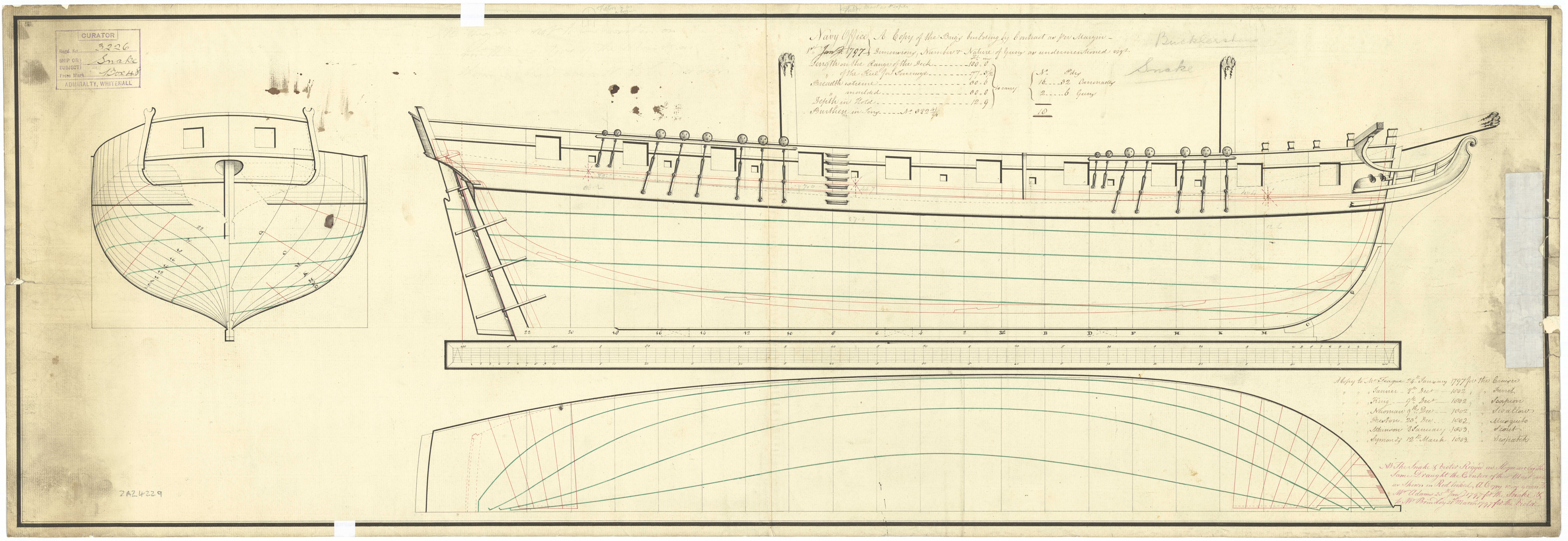
Original builder's plan for the Scout

HMS Scout was a Cruizer-class brig-sloop built by Peter Atkinson & Co. at Hull and launched in 1804. She participated in a number of actions and captured several privateers in the Mediterranean during the Napoleonic Wars. The Navy sold her in 1827. In 1829 she reappeared as the British Southern Whale Fisheries whaler Diana. Diana made three voyages for Daniel Bennett & Son until condemned after an on-board explosion in April 1843 towards the end of her fourth voyage.

== Napoleonic Wars ==
In 1805 Scout was under Commander D. H. Mackay. On 4 October Melpomene, Unite, Moselle and Scout left Portsmouth together as they escorted a convoy of 33 merchant vessels on its way to Gibraltar. However, on 13 October, Scout and three merchant vessels left the convoy to go to Porto. As a result, Scout arrived at Gibraltar two days after the Battle of Trafalgar.

Commander William Raitt assumed command in February 1806. On the morning of 27 March 1807, off Cádiz, Scout, engaged the Spanish felucca privateer Admiral, out of Tarifa, under the command of Sebastian Boralta. Scout saw the ship about an hour before it anchored, but was five hours getting within cannon range. As Scout approached, Admiral fired the two 24-pounder guns she carried in her bows, but the crew of Admiral were forced to cut her anchor cable and run her onshore within 10 minutes of the start of return fire. Evidently pierced by the Scout's shots, Admiral began filling with water. The strong surf prevented Scout from sending her boats to capture Admiral, but by the time Riatt sailed in the next day the felucca had wrecked completely. As well as the two 24-pounders in her bow, Admiral had carried two 6-pounder guns and six 12-pounder carronades. Reportedly, she also had had a crew of 90-100 men.

On 10 May Scout captured a Spanish settee, St. Antonio Abad, of nine men and 20 tons burthen. She was sailing from Marabella to Ceuta with a cargo of bricks, leather and the like. Two days later, Scout captured a Spanish brig carrying bale goods and loaf sugar.

Late on 21 May 1807, Raitt sent his boats and those of Morgiana in pursuit of several vessels spotted sailing past Cape Trafalgar with the aim of clearing the Straits under cover of darkness. The boats succeeded in capturing the privateer San Francisco Settaro (or Francisco Solano, or Determinada). The privateer fired heavily on the boats before they captured her, killing one seaman from Scout, and wounding another. San Francisco Settaro was armed with one 18-pounder gun in her bow and two other carriage guns, together with swivels and small arms, and had a crew of 29 men. Raitt described his prize "a large Vessel, about Three Months old, and in my Opinion well calculated for the Gun Boat Service at Gibraltar."

On 13 June Scout and her sister-ship Redwing chased three vessels into the Barbate river. Raitt sent boats from both Scout and Redwing to destroy the vessels, which consisted of a Spanish privateer, a Letter of Marque, and a felucca. The Spanish privateer was the De Bonne Vassallio, of one 24-pounder and two 6-pounder guns. She had a crew of 42 men, all but four of whom escaped ashore. The only British casualty was one man whom a splinter injured when the privateer blew up. The boarding party also captured two signal posts, together with their flags.

On 21 June Scout captured Fair American. That same day, Scout was off Lagos in the Algarve with Major General Spencer on board. From her deck he wrote to Viscount Castlereagh with a brief history of the Spanish insurrection. Four days earlier he had written congratulations from the Windsor Castle on the surrender of the French fleet at Cádiz to the Spanish.

On 11 September Scout captured the Danish ships Gode Haab, Jacob Kielland and Son, and Anna. Then on 20 October Scout detained the Russian ship Bella Aurora.

On 4 April 1808 Scout captured the American ship Mary Alice.

At the end of the year, on 7 December, Scout joined Vice-Admiral Lord Collingwood's squadron off Toulon.

Early on 14 June 1809, near Cape Croisette south of Marseilles, Raitt encountered a convoy of 14 Spanish merchant vessels and two gunboats. Scout set off in pursuit but after the wind dropped in the afternoon Raitt had to continue the pursuit using his boats. The convoy dispersed as seven of the vessels headed for a small nearby harbour. Scout's boats went in under fire from a shore battery. A landing party captured the battery, spiking the two 6-pounder guns there. The boats then captured and sailed out the seven Spanish vessels. British casualties were one man killed and five wounded. The Spanish vessels were carrying wool, grain, leather, flour and cheese. Raitt destroyed two of the vessels after removing their cargoes; the five others he sent to Port Mahon.

A landing party from Scout made a similar attack on a battery at Carry-le-Rouet, some 20 miles west of Marseilles on 14 July. The landing party captured the fort and spiked the guns. In the attack the British killed five enemy soldiers and captured seven, without suffering any loss themselves. At some point in 1809 Commander T. Stamp took temporary command of Scout.

In the middle of August, Scout put into Gibraltar to repair damage. She had encountered in the Gulf of Genoa two French privateers, one of 20 guns and one of 18 guns. Scout repelled the two enemy vessels, but lost six men killed and 25 wounded in the engagement.

In October 1809 Commander Alexander Renton Sharpe replaced Raitt. Between 30 October and 1 November Scout was part of Hallowell's squadron at the Bay of Rosas. On 30 October, boats from Scout joined with boats from Tigre, Cumberland, Volontaire, Apollo, Topaze, Philomel, and Tuscan in a cutting out attack after a squadron off the south of France chased an enemy convoy into the Bay of Rosas in the Battle of Maguelone. The convoy had lost its escorting ships of the line, Robuste and Lion, ran aground and scuttled by their crew near Frontignan, but were nevertheless heavily protected by an armed storeship of 18 guns, two bombards, and a xebec. Some of the British boats took heavy casualties in the clash, but neither Scout nor her sister-ship Philomel suffered any losses. By the following morning the British had accounted for all eleven vessels in the bay, burning those they did not bring out. In January 1813, prize money was awarded to the British vessels that took part in the action for the capture of the ships of war Gromlire and Normande, and of the transports Dragon and Indien. A court declared Invincible a joint captor. Head money was also paid for Grondire and Normande and for the destruction of Lemproye and Victoire. In 1847 the Admiralty awarded the Naval General Service Medal with clasp "1 Nov. Boat Service 1809" to all surviving claimants from the action.

On 26 June 1810, Scout and Success captured Fortune.

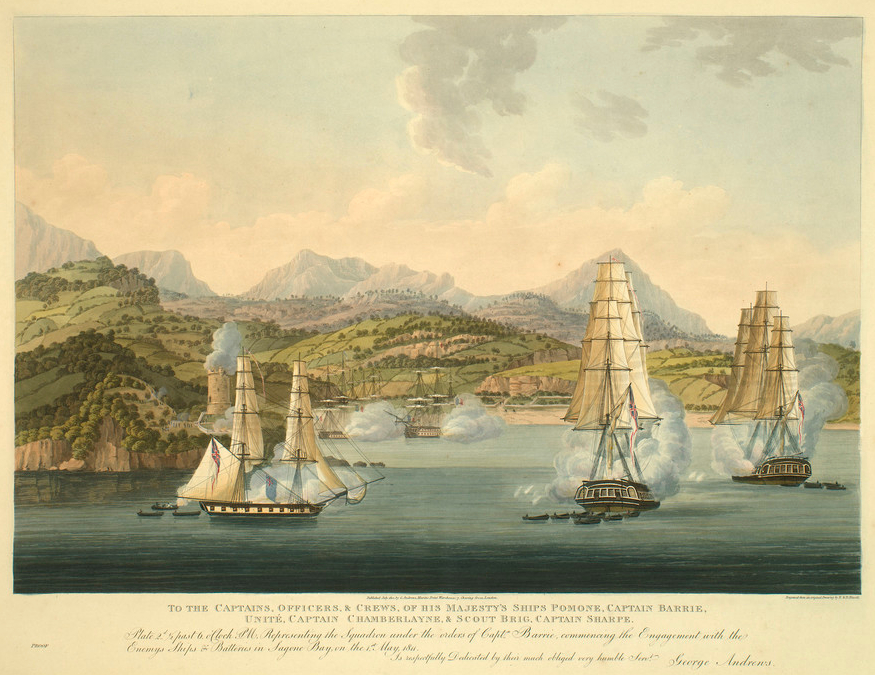
Scout, Captain Alexander Renton Sharpe, (far left) at Sagone Bay, 1 May 1811

On 30 April 1811, Scout, together with Unite and Pomone, found three French ships laden with wood for the naval arsenal at Toulon that had taken refuge in the Bay of Sagone on Corsica's east coast. The French vessels were anchored under the protection of a shore battery of four guns and a mortar, a Martello tower armed with a gun overlooking the battery, and some 200 troops with field pieces, assisted by armed local inhabitants, all on a heights overlooking the vessels. The French vessels were Giraffe, of 26 guns, Nourrice, of 24 guns, and the armed merchant vessel Henriette.

The next day Captain Robert Barrie of Pomone had boats from Pomone and Scout tow their ships close to the French vessels. After a 90-minute engagement, Giraffe and Nourrice caught fire. (French records report that their crews set the two vessels on fire to prevent their being captured and then abandoned them.) Brands from Nourrice set fire to the merchant vessel. Barrie had the British withdraw, awaiting the explosion of the French vessels. The battery and the tower fell silent. Shortly thereafter the Giraffe exploded, and then so did Nourrice. Some of the timbers from Nourrice fell on the tower, demolishing it, with further sparks setting fire to the shore battery, which also blew up. With nothing left to accomplish, the British withdrew. The action cost the British two men killed and 25 wounded, including three men wounded on Scout. French casualties were six dead and 30 wounded.

In October 1811, Scout left Gibraltar for England. However, a squall carried away her main boom and winds forced her back. Once she was repaired she sailed again, carrying dispatches.

In 1812 Commander G.W. Hooper replaced Sharpe, and in 1813 Benjamin Crispin replaced Hooper.

In January 1813 Commander James Murray was appointed to command Scout, though it may have taken some time for the change of command to be effective. On 17 February Scout captured the French privateer Fortune (or Fortuna) off Cagliari in the Strait of Bonifacio. Fortune was armed with three guns and carried 36 men; she was three days out of Tunis. One of the prize money announcements for the capture of "Buova La Fortuna" gives the name of Scout's commander as Crispin.

On 23 July, Scout, with Alcmene and Cephalus, captured the American ship Violet. James Murray may not have assumed command until December 1813.

== Post-war ==
In 1815 Scout was in Spithead. On 19 January Scout saved the doghter Alida. In July, Lieutenant Samuel Hellard of Scout faced a court martial. The charges were that he had threatened to shoot or drown a seaman who had deserted Scout, if the seaman ever returned, and that he had shown disrespect to Murray. The court-martial board severely reprimanded Hellard and moved his name to the bottom of the lieutenant's list.

In 1816 to 1817 Scout was in Deptford. In April 1818 she sailed for the Mediterranean under Commander William Ramsden, late of Ferret. By October 1821 she was under Commander John Theed, and at Chatham.

In June 1822 Commander James Wigston took command of Scout and sailed her to the West Indies. (Note: For more on James Wigston see: O'Byrne, William R. (1849). "Wigston, James" . A Naval Biographical Dictionary. London: John Murray.) On 3 November she captured the "piratical vessel" Amazon and the 46 men aboard her. (Note: Bounty money for the 46 men was paid in 1827. A first-class share was worth £175 2s 11¼d; a sixth-class share, that of an ordinary seaman, was worth £1 13s 6d.) Scout then suffered damage from stranding in May 1823 in the Gulf of Mexico. She might have been lost if HMS Grecian, Lieutenant John Cawley, had not rendered assistance.

Disposal: Scout was paid off in 1825. The "Principal Officers and commissioners of His Majesty's Navy" offered "Scout brig, of 382 tons", lying at Portsmouth, for sale on 11 July 1827. She sold on that day for £1,010 to John Small Sedger for breaking up.

== Whaler ==
Scout reappeared in 1829 as the ship Diana, launched at Hull in 1804. She appeared in Lloyd's Register (LR) with J.Palmer, master, Bennett, owner, and trade London–South Seas. She had undergone a large repair in 1829.

=== 1st whaling voyage (1829–1832) ===
Captain Palmer sailed from London on 5 May 1829, bound for the waters off New Zealand. Diana was reported at the Bay of Islands, Tongatabu, Honolulu, and Guam. She arrived back at England on 22 April 1832. She had more than 1300 barrels of whale oil.

=== 2nd whaling voyage (1832–1835) ===
Captain Heriot (or Harriet, or Hariot) sailed from London on 31 July 1832, bound for Timor and the seas off Japan. Diana was reported to have been off Japan and at Timor. She returned to England on 1 December 1835 with 500 casks of oil.

=== 3rd whaling voyage (1836–1839) ===
Captain Herriott sailed from England on 29 April 1836, bound for Timor. She was reported at Lombok, Timor, and the Bay of Islands. She returned to England on 7 July 1839 with 420 casks of whale oil.

== Fate ==
Captain James May sailed from England on 26 August 1839. Diana was reported at Mauritius and Coupang. At some point the mate murdered May. She was at Saint Helena on her way home when an explosion took place on board her on 26 April 1843 that caused a great deal of damage and killed at least eight crew members. She was condemned on 29 April.

The origins of the explosion were unclear. One contemporary report was "[it was] supposed that a train had been laid to her magazine by a dastardly incendiary."

LR for 1843 had the annotation "Condemned" by Diana's name.
