= French brig Ronco (1808) =

French brig, later a Royal Navy ship and whaler

Ronco
History

France
- Name: Ronco
- Namesake: Ronco (river)
- Builder: Venice
- Laid down: June 1807
- Launched: April 1808
- Captured: 2 May 1808

United Kingdom
- Name: Tuscan
- Acquired: 2 May 1808 by capture
- Honours and awards: Naval General Service Medal with clasp "1 Nov. Boat Service 1809"
- Fate: Sold 29 January 1818

United Kingdom
- Name: Tuscan
- Owner: Thomas Pittman; Alexander & George Birnie
- Acquired: 29 January 1818 by purchase
- Fate: Condemned 1840; sold at public auction on 6 April 1840

General characteristics
- Displacement: 360 tons
- Tons burthen: 3343/94 or 380(bm)
- Length: 97 ft 7 in (29.7 m) (overall); 76 ft 5 in (23.3 m) (keel)
- Beam: 28 ft 8 in (8.7 m)
- Draught: 3.55 m (11.6 ft) (unloaded)
- Depth of hold: 4.38 m (14.4 ft)
- Sail plan: Brig
- Complement: French service:112; British service:100
- Armament: French service: 14 × 24-pounder carronades + 2 × 6 or 12-pounder chase guns; British service: 14 × 24-pounder carronades + 2 × 9-pounder chase guns

Ronco was a French Illyrien or Friedland-class brig built at Venice and launched in April 1808. HMS Unite captured her less than two months later. The Royal Navy took her into service as HMS Tuscan. She served in the Mediterranean and participated in one action that earned her crew a Naval General Service Medal. She was first offered for sale in 1816 and sold in 1818. At that time mercantile interests purchased her and she became a whaler, making six voyages before being condemned as no longer seaworthy in March 1840 and sold in April during her seventh voyage.

== Capture ==
Unite encountered Ronco at daybreak on 2 May 1808 some seven or eight miles NW of Cape Promontore, Istria. Ronco fired several broadsides that cut up Unite's sails and rigging, and then surrendered. Captain Campbell of Unite described Ronco as being armed with sixteen 32-pounder carronades, and "only Two Months off the Stocks, measures about Four Hundred Tons, extremely well found, and in my Opinion, very fit for His Majesty's Service." Ronco had barely struck when Unite sighted a frigate and a schooner to windward. Unite immediately gave chase, but her quarry escaped into Pola. The Royal Navy heeded Campbell and took Ronco into service as HMS Tuscan.

== HMS Tuscan ==
Tuscan was commissioned in August 1808 in the Mediterranean under Commander John Gourley (acting). One month later Commander John Wilson replaced Gourly.

Between 30 October and 1 November Tuscan was part of Admiral Benjamin Hallowell's squadron at the Bay of Rosas. On 30 October, boats from Tuscan joined with boats from HMS Tigre, Cumberland, Volontaire, Apollo, Topaze, Philomel, and Scout in a cutting out attack after a squadron off the south of France chased an enemy convoy into the Bay of Rosas in the Battle of Maguelone. The convoy had lost its escorting ships of the line, Robuste and Lion, which had run aground near Frontignan and been scuttled by their crew. Still an armed storeship of 18 guns, two bombards, and a xebec protected the convoy. Some of the British boats took heavy casualties in the clash, but Tuscan had only one officer slightly wounded, and one seaman dangerously wounded. By the following morning the British had accounted for all eleven vessels in the bay, burning those they did not bring out. In January 1813, prize money was awarded to the British vessels that took part in the action for the capture of the ships of war Grondeur and Normande, and of the transports Dragon and Indien. A court declared Invincible a joint captor. Head money was also paid for the Grondeur and Normande and for the destruction of Lamproie and Victoire. In 1847 the Admiralty awarded the Naval General Service Medal with clasp "1 Nov. Boat Service 1809" to all surviving claimants from the action.

In December 1810 Commander George Matthew Jones replaced Wilson. However, in January 1811, Lieutenant Phillips (acting) took temporary command. Jones returned to command by February, holding it until through 1812.

In 1811 Tuscan supported the British Army in Spain, especially in the efforts to break the siege of Cadiz by landing troops to attack the French at Isla de León. In 20 February a naval force of warships and transports under the command of Captain Edwin Brace HMS St Albans weighed anchor. The 7000 troops Lieutenant-General Thomas Graham landed at Algeciras and marched to Tariffa. There the transports the artillery and military stores in heavy surf. Subsequently, Graham participated in the Battle of Barrossa.The Royal Navy ships involved, in addition to St Alban's and Tuscan, included Druid, Comus, Sabine, Ephira, Steady and Rebuff.

In October, a French force was pressing on Spanish General Francisco Ballesteros in the vicinity of San Roque, Cádiz. Ballasteros asked for assistance. Rear-Admiral Legge, the commander of the British fleet at Cadiz, dispatched a force on 11 October to Tariffa to come to his assistance. Stately, Columbine and Tuscan carried eight companies each from the 47th and 87th regiments of foot, a detachment of 70 men from the 95th Regiment, and four light artillery pieces. The troops landed on 18 October and the next day the French advanced along the coast. Fire from Tuscan, Stately's boats, and Gunboat 14 sent them into retreat.

When the War of 1812 broke out, the British captured several American ships in the Mediterranean. Tuscan shared with San Juan, Sabine, Lavinia, Hindostan, and Hyacinth in the American droits for Phoenix, Margaret, Allegany and Tyger, captured on 8 August 1812. (Note: In May 1816 there was distribution to the sharing vessels of their portions of two-thirds of the first three American vessels and nine-tenths of Tyger. A first-class share was worth £120 16s 0 1/2d; a sixth-class share was worth £1 19s 9 1/4d.)

Tuscan arrived at Portsmouth on 11 October, having convoyed transports from Gibraltar.

In May 1813, Jones recommissioned Tuscan, which returned to the Mediterranean. Tuscan shared with Pomone and some other British vessels in the salvage for the recapture two Spanish vessels El Correv Diligente de Carraccas and Nostra Senora de los Desemperados on 26 May. (Note: A first-class share of the prize money was worth £4 0s 8 3/4d; a sixth-class share, that of an ordinary seaman, was worth 7d.)

On 6 or 8 July 1815 a privateer of one gun and 20 men came into Genoa. Tuscan had captured her off Elba, of 3 July. (Note: The proceeds for the vessel itself were paid in October 1832. A first-class share was worth £31 6s 10 1/2d; a sixth-class share was worth 10s 2 1/4d. Head money was paid in February 1833. A first-class share was worth £43 6s 3d; a sixth-class share was worth 14s 1d. Unusually, the notice has the number of each class of shares issued, providing a breakdown of the structure of the crew.)

Tuscan arrived at Portsmouth on 29 November from the west.

Disposal: The Principal Officers and Commissioners of the Navy offered the "Tuscan brig, of 334 tons", lying at Plymouth for sale on 28 August 1816. However, she did not sell. Still, though in ordinary at Plymouth, Tuscan was able to be of some use. On 8 November 1817 the port authorities moored her to serve as a breakwater sheltering workmen building a new pier. Finally, after numerous unsuccessful listings, Tuscan sold on 29 January 1818 Thomas Pittman for £800.

== Whaler ==
Tuscan became a whaling ship, making her first of seven whaling voyages in 1819. Her owners were Alexander & George Birnie. Tuscan first appears in the Register of Shipping in 1819 with C. Colman, master, and "Burnie", owner.

Captain Coleman sailed Tuscan on her first whaling voyage, leaving England on 5 October 1819. In May 1820 she was at Port Jackson. There she loaded the oil that the whaler Martha had gathered before Martha was condemned as unseaworthy. Tuscan carried the cargo back to England.

For her second whaling voyage, Tuscan left London on 7 May 1821 and was at Portsmouth on 18 May. She was under the command of Francis Stavers and bound for Timor. She sailed in company with Zephyr and Earl Morley. She arrive at Tahiti on 25 September and stayed into October 1821. She brought with her as passengers the Rev. Mr. Tyerman, and Mr. George Bennett, whom the directors of the London Missionary Society had deputed to visit the islands, as well as the new missionary, the Rev. Mr. Jones, and Messrs. Armitage and Blossom, artisans, and their wives. She revisited Tahiti on 22 April 1822. She visited Honolulu and by 1823 had 1500 barrels of sperm oil. On 2 June 1823 she was at Mauritius with about 200 tons of oil. Later she was reported off Madagascar with 200 tons of sperm oil leaking, otherwise she would be full. Tuscan arrived back in Britain on 20 October 1823 with 420 casks.

Thomas Reed Stavers was Tuscan's captain for her third, and three subsequent whaling voyage. She left Britain on 17 January 1824, bound for the Sandwich Islands. She was at Tahiti from February to March 1826, and at Honolulu 18 to 20 May 1826. She was reported at Mowee and at Honolulu with 2200 barrels. Tuscan returned to Britain on 7 May 1827.

Stavers and Tuscan left Britain on 16 September 1827 on her fourth whaling voyage. She was at Madeira on 27 September 1827. She was then at Honolulu on 5 November 1828 and at Tahiti in December 1828. She returned to Honolulu from 9 to 13 May 1829 and was there again on 1 October 1829 with 2150 barrels. Tuscan returned to Britain on 20 April 1830 2ith 520 casks of oil.

Tuscan left Britain on her fifth whaling voyage on 5 September 1830. She was at Tahiti in March 1831. She sailed to Honolulu from Tahiti and Maui, arriving 29 April 1831. She was at Honolulu on 24 September 1831 with 110 barrels. However she left Maui on 9 May 1832 with 1400 barrels. From Maui Tuscan was at Honolulu between 27 October to 14 November 1832, with 1850 barrels. Stavers and Tuscan returned to Britain on 11 June 1833.

Stavers and Tuscan left Britain on her sixth whaling voyage on 17 October 1833. She was at Tahiti 22 to 26 March 1834 with 60 barrels. She was then at Honolulu 16 May 1834 from Tahiti with 60 barrels. She visited Pitcairn Island on 8 March 1834. She then returned to Oahu where she stopped from 7 to 20 October 1834 with 500 barrels. On 8 April 1835 she had built up her catch to 800 barrels. From 5 October to 3 November she was at Honolulu with 1700 barrels, being repaired. She was at Tahiti 11 March 1836. She reached St Helena by 26 September, bound for London with 1950 barrels.

Tuscan, Watson, master, left Britain in 1837. she was reported to have been at Tahiti from 24 February to 20 March 1838 with sperm oil. By 22 March she was reported to have gathered 850 barrels. She was reported to have been at Oahu from 14 to 21 October 1838, still with 850 barrels. She visited Maui and Lahaina but without catching anything. She was at Honolulu 2 to 22 September 1839 and reported that although she had been out 29 months, she had taken only 200 barrels in the preceding 12 months and 100 in the season. All whalers reported having done poorly. After 36 months out she was at New Zealand, with 1300 barrels.

== Fate ==
On 29 February 1840 there was a violent gale in the Bay of Islands. Tuscan arrived there on 8 March, much battered by heavy gales. One report gave the name of her master as "White". On 24 March she was still there, with 1,300 barrels of sperm oil.

Tuscan was condemned at the Bay of Islands in late March or early April 1840 as no longer seaworthy. She was sold at public auction on 6 April.
