= French ship Tigre (1793) =

Ship of the line of the French Navy

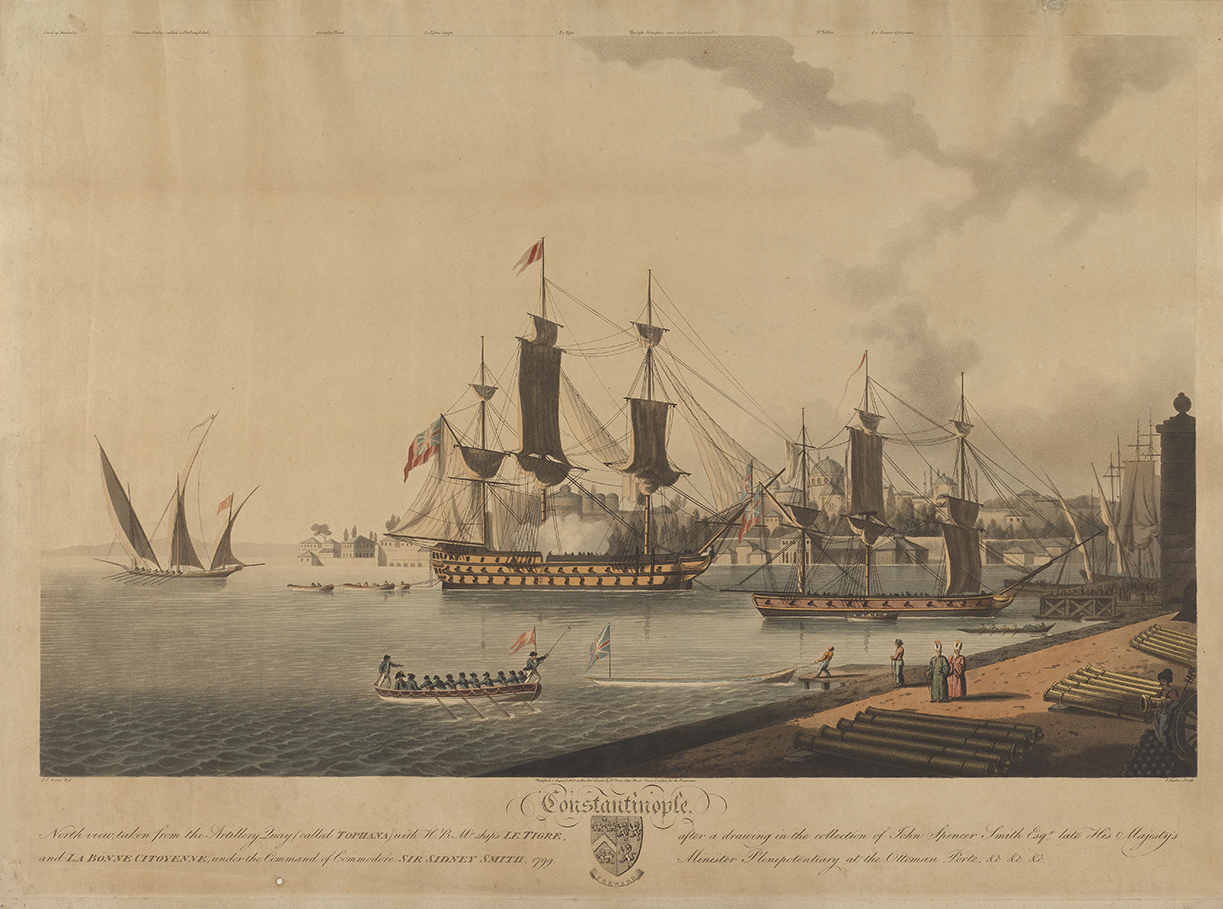
- Tigre (centre) in Constantinople in 1799

History

France
- Name: Tigre
- Namesake: Tiger
- Builder: Brest
- Laid down: 1790
- Launched: 8 May 1793
- Captured: 22 June 1795

Great Britain
- Name: Tigre
- Acquired: 22 June 1795 by capture
- Honours and awards: Naval General Service Medal with clasp "Egypt"
- Fate: Broken up, June 1817

General characteristics
- Class & type: Téméraire-class ship of the line
- Displacement: 3,069 tonneaux
- Tons burthen: 1,537 port tonneaux
- Length: 55.87 metres (183.3 ft) (172 pied)
- Beam: 14.90 metres (48 ft 11 in)
- Draught: 7.26 metres (23.8 ft) (22 pied)
- Propulsion: Up to 2,485 m^{2} (26,750 sq ft) of sails
- Armament: Lower gundeck: 28 × 36-pounder long guns; Upper gundeck: 30 × 18-pounder long guns; Fc and QD: 16 × 8-pounder long guns + 4 × 36-pounder carronades
- Armour: Timber

Tigre was a 74-gun ship of the line of the French Navy. Later it was captured by the British and, as HMS Tigre, operated as part of the Royal Navy throughout the Napoleonic Wars.

== French service ==
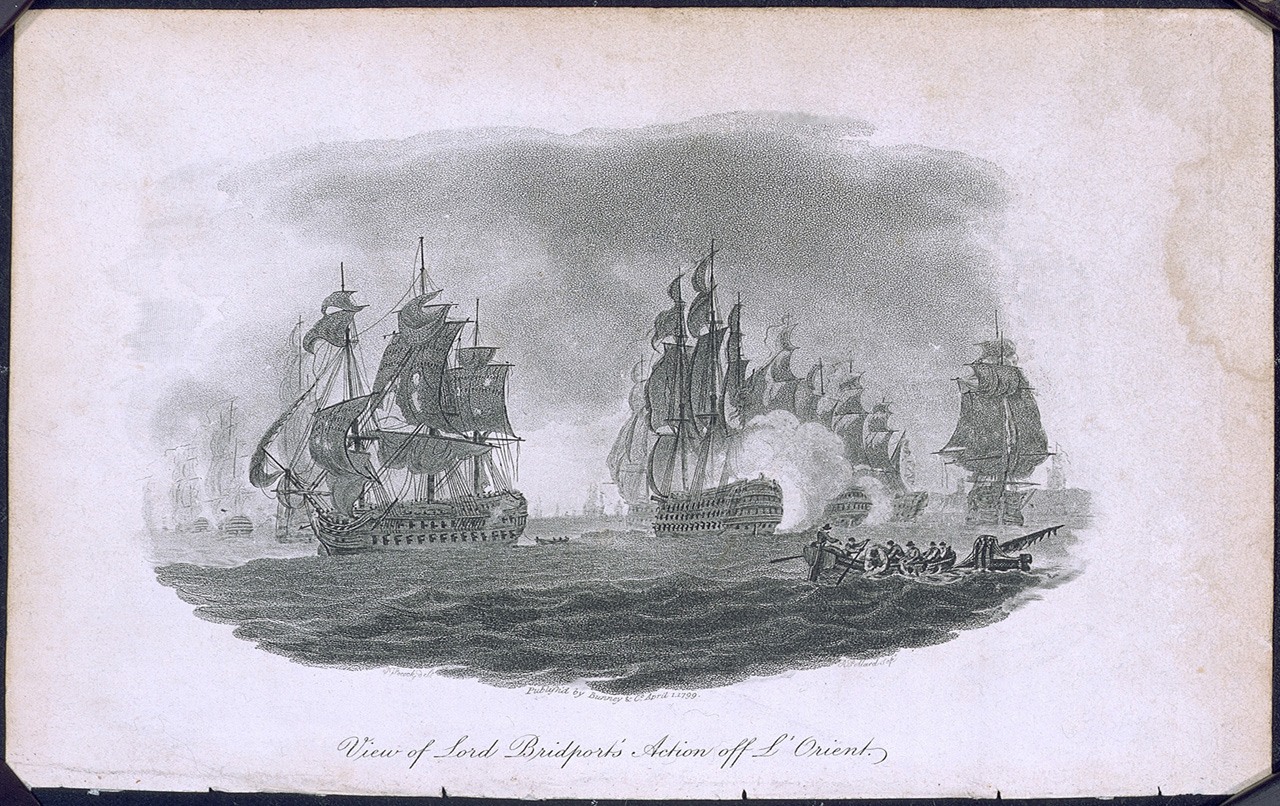
Tigre (left) at the Battle of Groix, where she was captured

Her first captain was Pierre Jean Van Stabel. When Van Stabel was promoted, she became the flagship of his 6-ship squadron. She notably fought in 1793 to rescue the French frigate Sémillante, along with the ship of the line Jean Bart.

Under Jacques Bedout, she took part in the Battle of Groix where she was captured by the British. She was recommissioned in the Royal Navy as HMS Tigre.

== British service ==
Under the Royal Navy she assisted in the defence of Acre during Bonaparte's siege. Her crew qualified for the clasp "Acre 30 May 1799" to the Naval General Service Medal authorised in 1850 for all surviving claimants (27 awarded).

On 8 January 1801 Penelope captured the French bombard St. Roche, which was carrying wine, liqueurs, ironware, Delft cloth, and various other merchandise, from Marseilles to Alexandria. Swiftsure, Tigre, Minotaur, Northumberland, Florentina, and the schooner Malta, were in sight and shared in the proceeds of the capture.

Because Tigre served in the Navy's Egyptian campaign between 8 March 1801 and 2 September, her officers and crew qualified for the clasp "Egypt" to the Naval General Service Medal that the Admiralty authorised in 1850 for all surviving claimants (33 awarded). (Note: A first-class share of the prize money awarded in April 1823 was worth £34 2s 4d; a fifth-class share, that of a seaman, was worth 3s 11½d. The amount was small as the total had to be shared between 79 vessels and the entire army contingent.)

After the Battle of Trafalgar on 21 October 1805, Tigre continued in the blockade of Cadiz. On 25 November, Thunderer detained the Ragusan ship Nemesis, which was sailing from Isle de France to Leghorn, Italy, with a cargo of spice, indigo dye, and other goods. Tigre shared the prize money with ten other British warships.

From 30 October to 1 November 1809 Admiral Benjamin Hallowell's squadron was at the Bay of Rosas. On 30 October, in the Battle of Maguelone, boats from Tigre joined with boats from Tuscan, Cumberland, Volontaire, Apollo, Topaz, Philomel, and Scout in a cutting out attack after a squadron off the south of France chased an enemy convoy into the Bay of Rosas. The convoy had lost its escorting ships of the line, Robuste and Lion, run aground near Frontignan and scuttled by their crew, but were nevertheless heavily protected by an armed storeship of 18 guns, two bombards and a xebec. Some of the British boats took heavy casualties in the clash, but Tuscan had only one officer slightly wounded, and one seaman with serious injuries. By the following morning the British had accounted for all eleven vessels in the bay, burning those they did not bring out. In January 1813 prize money was awarded to the British vessels that took part in the action for the capture of the ships of war Gromlire and Normande, and of the transports Dragon and Indien. A court declared Invincible a joint captor. Head money was also paid for Grondire and Normande and for the destruction of Lemproye and Victoire. In 1847 the Admiralty awarded the Naval General Service Medal with clasp "1 Nov. Boat Service 1809" to all surviving claimants from the action.

== Fate ==
She was eventually broken up in June 1817.
