= HMS Apollo (1805) =

Frigate of the Royal Navy

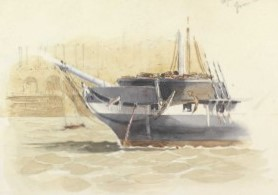
- Apollo at Sheerness, December 1850, by Captain George Pechell Mends

History

United Kingdom
- Name: HMS Apollo
- Ordered: 7 November 1803
- Builder: George Parsons, Bursledon
- Cost: £34,601
- Laid down: April 1804
- Launched: 27 June 1805
- Commissioned: July 1805
- Fate: Broken up, 16 October 1856

General characteristics
- Class & type: Lively-class fifth-rate frigate
- Tons burthen: 108577/94 (bm)
- Length: Overall: 154 ft 3 1/2 in (47.0 m); Keel: 129 ft 9 3/8 in (39.6 m)
- Beam: 39 ft 8 in (12.1 m)
- Depth of hold: 13 ft 6 in (4.1 m)
- Sail plan: Full-rigged ship
- Complement: As frigate: 284 officers and men (later 300); As troopship: 80 men
- Armament: Frigate: Upper deck: 28 × 18-pounder guns; QD: 2 × 9-pounder guns, 12 × 32-pounder carronades; Fc: 2 × 9-pounder guns, 2 × 32-pounder carronades; Troopship: 6 × 18-pounder carronades + 2 × 9-pounder guns

HMS Apollo, the fifth ship of the Royal Navy to be named for the Greek god Apollo, was a fifth-rate frigate of the Lively class, carrying 38 guns, launched in 1805 and broken up in 1856.

== Napoleonic Wars ==
Apollo was commissioned in July 1805 under Captain Edward Fellowes, who sailed her for the Mediterranean on 26 January 1806. In 1806 she operated off southern Italy. On 5 June boats from Apollo brought out a French brig near Agie Finucana, in the Gulf of Taranto, where the brig had run aground. The brig was transporting six 24-pounder guns, together with their carriages. The cutting out party had to work through the night under small-arms fire from the shore, as well as fire from a field piece. Still, they managed to retrieve the vessel while suffering only one man wounded. The guns were intended for a new battery opposite the lighthouse.

On 6 July Captain Fellowes was at the Battle of Maida, having been ordered to join the troops by Rear-Admiral Sir Sidney Smith to act as liaison with the Navy should the Army have had to retire. General James Stuart remarked in his account of the battle that Fellowes had been helpful in every way. On 8 July 1806, 400 Polish soldiers surrendered at Tropea Castle to the captain of HMS Apollo.

In October Apollo came under the command of Captain Alexander Schomberg. In 1807 she took part in the Alexandria expedition of 1807 in the squadron under the command of Admiral Benjamin Hallowell. However, she and the 19 transports (out of 33) that she was escorting got separated from the rest of the expedition and arrived at Abu Qir Bay too late to participate meaningfully. Seven-and-a-half years later, in October 1814, Apollo, Tigre and Wizard would share in prize money for the capture of the Turkish frigates Houri Bahar and Houri Nasaret, and the corvette Feragh Nouma as well as the stores captured on 20 March. (Note: A captain's share was £138 16s 3d; a seaman's share was 9s 8 1/2d.)

In 1808, Captain Bridges Taylor took command of Apollo. Under Taylor, she raided French convoys in the western Mediterranean.

On 3 June 1808, Rear Admiral Thornbrough sent Sir Francis Laforey in Apollo to negotiate with the Supreme Junta of the Balearic Isles. the citizens of Mallorca had declared their allegiance to Ferdinand II and wished to begin talks with the British. At the end of the year Apollo returned to Britain.

Between 30 and 31 October 1809, in the Battle of Maguelone boats from Apollo participated in the attack by Hallowell's squadron on vessels of a French convoy that had taken refuge in the Bay of Rosas where they hoped that an armed storeship of 18 guns, two bombards and a xebec would provide them protection. On 30 October Tigre, Cumberland, Volontaire, Apollo, Topaze, Philomel, Tuscan and Scout sent in their boats. By the following morning the British had accounted for all eleven vessels in the bay, burning those they did not bring out. However, British losses were considerable, numbering 15 killed and 44 wounded overall, with Apollo alone suffering three dead and five wounded. The French vessels captured were the warships Grondire and Normande, and the transports Dragon and Indien. The boats also destroyed the Lemproye and Victoire. A court declared Invincible a joint captor. (Note: Head money was paid for Grondire and Normande and for the destruction of Lemproye and Victoire.)

In 1811 Apollo returned to the Mediterranean, fighting a large number of small-scale actions and raiding various French-held islands.

On 16 November 1811, after a nine-hour chase, Apollo captured the French polacre privateer Edouard. She was pierced for 14 guns, but only had six mounted, four of which she threw overboard during the chase. She had a crew of 123 men under the command of Jean F. Mordeilles, an Imperial knight. Edouard was eight days out of Marseilles.

On 13 February 1812, Apollo took the French frigate Merinos while operating off Cap Corse. Merinos was a relatively new frigate-built storeship of 850 tons, pierced for 36 guns but carrying only 20 eight-pounders. She had a crew of 126 men under the command of Captain de fregate Honoré Coardonan, holder of the Legion d'Honour. She was on her way to Sagone, Corsica for timber. The French lost six killed and 20 wounded; the British, despite also coming under fire from the shore, suffered no casualties. The French corvette Mohawk, accompanying Merinos, did not come to her aid and escaped. According to Taylor Mohawk had a crew of 130 men and some conscripts, and was a British ship by the same name that had been captured in 1799.

On 24 April Apollo, Eagle and Havannah landed Lieutenant-colonel George Duncan Robertson, his staff and a garrison at Port St. George on Lissa. The British had defeated a French naval force on 13 March at the Battle of Lissa and wanted to establish a base there with Robertson as its first Governor.

On 17 September Apollo captured the 6-gun privateer xebec Ulysse. She had a crew of 56 men under the command of Monsieur Oletta, commander of a division of gun-boats at Corfu. (Note: The first-class share of the prize money was £60 12s 1d; a sixth-class share was 7s 4 1/2d.)

On 21 December Apollo was in company with the brig-sloop Weazel when the two vessels chased a trabaccolo under the protection of the tower of San Cataldo, the strongest such on the coast between Brindisi and Otranto. The tower was armed with three guns and three swivel guns. A landing party from the two vessels captured the tower and blew it up.

Between 18 January and 3 February 1813, Apollo, together with the privateer Esperanza and four gunboats, and some 300 troops under the command of Lieutenant-Colonel G. D. Robertson, captured Augusta and Carzola Islands. At Augusta, a party of seamen from Apollo spiked the guns of one battery. On 1 February Taylor sailed Apollo, the brig-sloop Imogen, under the command of Lieutenant Charles Taylor, and Gunboat No. 43, under the command of Mr. Antonio Pardo, to Carzola. There Captain Taylor commanded a landing party that silenced several sea batteries. When the town capitulated the British captured a privateer that had "molested the trade of the Adriatic", and two of her prizes. That day the British also captured seven vessels in the Channel, sailing to Ragusa and Cattaro, principally with grain, which was in short supply there. The action at Carzola cost Apollo two men dead, one of whom drowned, and one man wounded. (Note: A first-class share of the prize money was worth £38 18s 8d; a sixth-class share was worth 5s 3d.)

On 19 March, boats from Apollo and Cerberus destroyed several vessels, a battery and a tower three miles northwest of the port of Monopoli near Bari. Then on 11 April, Apollo and Cerberus took Devil's Island, near the north entrance to Corfu, and thereby captured a brig and a trabaccolo bringing in grain. On 14 April the boats chased a vessel into Merlera. They then suffered three men wounded before Apollo arrived and captured the island. The British found eight vessels with flour and grain that the enemy had scuttled. Ten days later, Apollo's boats chased a felucca into St Cataldo that had troops aboard. A landing party of marines killed one Frenchman, wounded another, and captured 26. (The rest of the troops and the crew of the felucca fled.) Apollo's boats brought out the felucca.

On 17 May boats from Apollo and Cerberus took a vessel that ran aground near Brindisi. She was armed with a 9-pounder gun in the bow and a swivel gun. She was sailing from Otranto to Ancona. The next day the boats also brought off a gun from a Martello tower a little further to the south. Then ten days later the boats captured three gunboats at Fano that were protecting a convoy. The gun-boats each mounted a 9-pounder in their bows and two 4-pounders abaft. They were under the command of an Ufficiale di Vascello, carrying troops for Corfu. The British also captured four vessels from the convoy. British losses amounted to two men killed and one wounded.

On 15 June Taylor positioned Apollo's boats to intercept four vessels heading into Corfu. They drove one ashore, but then had to turn their attention to a French gunboat that appeared, which they captured. She mounted both a 12 and a 6-pounder gun. In the engagement the French suffered nine men wounded, was the commander and a captain of engineers, Monsieur Baudrand. The gunboat also carried the colonel and chief of engineers of Corfu, (reportedly men of great ability), who were returning after having been to Parga and Pado to improve the fortifications there. Laurel was in company and took the captured gunboat to St. Maura while Apollo landed the wounded at Corfu. This caused a delay during which Apollo's boats remained near Morto, in Albania. At daylight the following morning six gun-boats, a felucca, and smaller row-boat, all full of troops attacked the boats. Lieutenant W. H. Nares, who had been in charge of the boats in all the above actions, ran them ashore near Parga. From the shore he and his men used their small arms to repel four attacks, during which Apollo's boats were destroyed. However, the British lost only one man, who was taken prisoner.

On 6 February 1814, Apollo and Havannah were at anchor outside Brindisi while the French frigate Uranie was inside the port, on fire. Cerberus had chased her into the port some weeks earlier while awaiting the action of the officials of the port, which belonged to the Kingdom of Naples, to the presence of the French vessel. When Apollo appeared on the scene and made signs of being about to enter the port, Uranie's captain removed the powder from his ship and set her on fire. (Note: A first-class share of the head money for the destruction of the Uranie was worth £159 9s 7 3/4d; a sixth-class share was worth £1 0s 8 1/2d.)

On 13 February 1814, the island of Paxos, in the Adriatic, surrendered to Apollo and a detachment of 160 troops. The troops moved so rapidly through the island that the enemy did not have time to organize resistance. As a result, the British force, which included inter alia men from the 2nd Greek Light Infantry from Cephalonia, from the Royal Corsican Rangers, the 35th Regiment of Foot, and marines and seamen from the Apollo, captured 122 enemy troops as well as a small, well-designed fort of three guns.

Captain Taylor drowned in early 1814, when his gig capsized as he was returning to Apollo from a reconnaissance at Brindisi. (Note: The crew of the gig drowned with him. An obituary remarks that his loss to drowning was surprising in that on three previous occasions he had himself saved crew men from drowning (presumably by swimming).) On 24 April Apollo was among the vessels at the capture of the fortress and town of Savona. (Note: A first-class share of the prize money was worth £71 10s 6 1/2d; a sixth-class share was worth 9s 5 1/2d.)

After Taylor's death, Apollo had several commanders in short order. E.L. Graham took command in June, and was followed by A.B. Valpy (acting), in August. Then W. Hamilton followed him.

Apollo then returned to England, where she was placed in ordinary at Portsmouth the following year.

== Post-war career ==
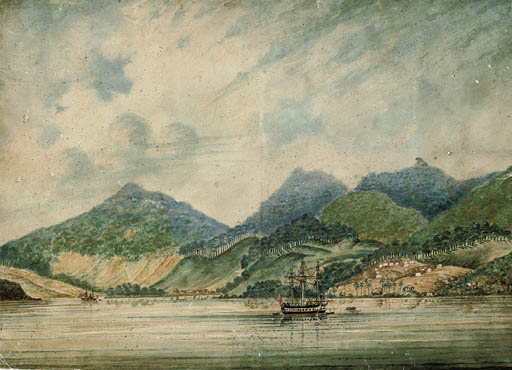
HM Troopship Apollo refitting a quarantine encampment of the 59th Regiment at Baia de Ilha Grande, Brazil, in 1849

After the end of the Napoleonic Wars Apollo served as a troopship for many years, including during the First Opium War. From February 1828 to 1838 she was under the command of Alexander Karley. Then in November 1841 C. Frederick took command.

In December 1837 she was fitted at Portsmouth, for £11,402, as a troopship. At this time her armament was reduced. In March 1840 she carried the main body of the 56th (West Essex) Regiment of Foot to Canada, where they reinforced the garrison there during the Northeastern Boundary Dispute. Then in November 1841 C. Frederick took command and sailed her to the Far East where she participated in the Yangtze operation in July 1842. On 20 June 1844, during a voyage from Quebec City, Province of Canada, British North America, to Sheerness, Kent, she ran aground on the Grain Spit, off the coast of Kent; she was refloated the next day and taken in to Chatham, Kent. By March 1845 Apollo was back at Portsmouth and under the command of W. Raddiff. In June 1845, Apollo was reported in the London papers to have been wrecked at St. Shott's, Newfoundland with the loss of 60 to 80 lives; the report was later confirmed to be in error.

In October 1845 she carried the 73rd (Highland) Regiment of Foot to South Africa, but was diverted to land troops in Montevideo as part of the intervention in the Uruguayan Civil War, and returned to England with despatches and wounded men in April 1846.

== Fate ==
In June 1856, the 1st Battalion, The Rifle Brigade embarked on Apollo at Balaclava at the end of the Crimean War for their return to England. She was broken up at Portsmouth on 16 October 1856.

== Figurehead ==
Figurehead of the Apollo. Photo: Solid Imagery © National Museum of the Royal Navy

HMS Apollo was fitted with two different figureheads during her career. The original 1805 figurehead did not survive, and no explanation was ever given as to why a new one was required. Carver Edward Hellyer, of Hellyer & Sons was commissioned by the Surveyor of the Navy to provide a new figurehead and it is this figurehead that can be seen in the collection at the National Museum of the Royal Navy, Portsmouth.
