= Battle of Maguelone =

1809 engagement of the Peninsular War

- Part of the Peninsular War
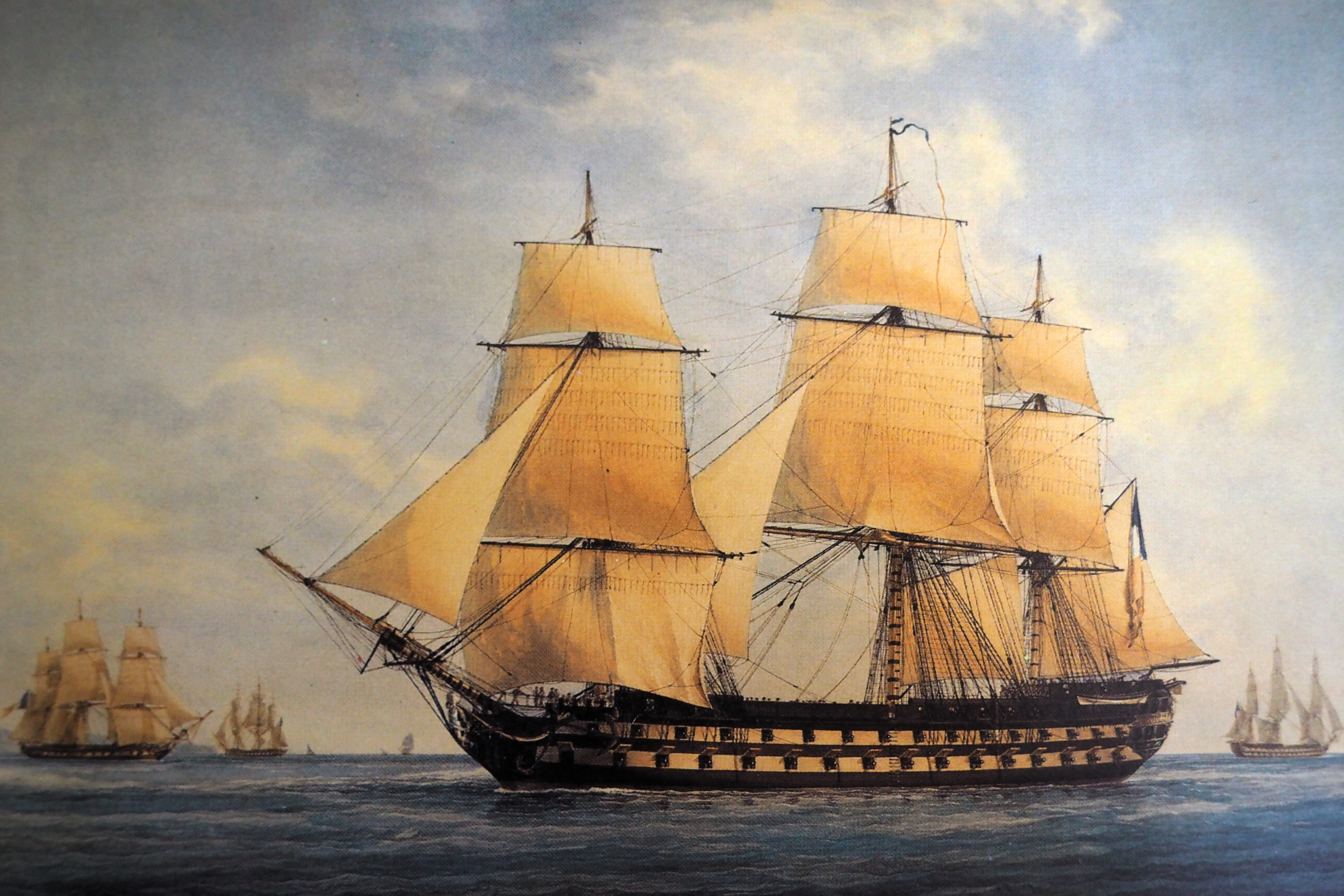
- A painting of Robuste by Antoine Roux
| Date | 25 October 1809 |
| Location | Off Sète, and Roses, Girona |
| Result | British victory |

Belligerents
| United Kingdom | France |

Commanders and leaders
| Cuthbert Collingwood | François-André Baudin |

Strength
| 15 ships of the line 5 frigates | 3 ships of the line 2 frigates Several transport ships |

Casualties and losses
| | 2 ships of the line scuttled |

The Battle of Maguelone was a naval engagement which occurred on 25 October 1809 during the Peninsular War between a French Imperial Navy squadron of three ships of the line and two frigates and a six-ship squadron of the British Royal Navy. In a running battle, the French squadron covered the retreat of a convoy they were escorting and attempted to escape from the British by sailing in shallow waters close to the shore of Villeneuve-lès-Maguelone. After two French ships of the line ran aground, their crews evacuated and scuttled them after removing valuable equipment, including the cannons onboard. The remaining ships of the French squadron then escaped to Toulon. A British cutting out party subsequently attacked the convoy off Roses, Girona on 1 November, destroying most of it and capturing three ships.

== Background ==
On 21 October 1809, a French Imperial Navy squadron under the command of Contre-Amiral François-André Baudin left Toulon, escorting a convoy bound for Barcelona that was intended to resupply French troops stationed in Spain as part of the Peninsular War. British Vice-Admiral Cuthbert Collingwood, having received word of the French departure from Barcelona, left Cape Sicié with a Royal Navy force of 15 ships of the line and five frigates to ambush the convoy off Cape Saint Sebastian. Two British frigates were also posted off Toulon to observe French naval movements.

The French squadron detected five British warships to the west of them near Cape Saint Sebastian on 23 October. With a light easterly wind, Baudin ordered the convoy to seek shelter in Roses, Girona, and had his squadron sail into the Mediterranean Sea. By noon, 14 British warships were in sight. In the night, the weather deteriorated and Baudin's squadron had to reduce sail, which was made difficult and longer to do than usual by the squadron's lack of training. On the morning of 24 October, the squadron found itself near the coast, and by 07:30, Baudin ordered his ships to anchor. With 16 metres under keel, he signaled his intention to set sail soon and seek refuge off Sète.

== Battle ==
On 25 October, the French squadron left their anchorage of Baie des Roses and sailed to the west, close to shore, with light winds from the east. The British resumed their chase, catching up on the French, as the wind was stronger further off at sea. Baudin ordered Pauline to run to Sète to warn of the incoming British squadron and have coastal defences manned and ready. At 11:30, the French ships started to touch bottom, and Baudin gave freedom of manoeuver to his captains. Borée managed to reach deeped waters, but Robuste and Lion ran aground.

Robuste and Lion rested on a bed of rock and hard sand, Lion east of Robuste, both ships out of range of the British. Meanwhile, Pauline and Borée came in range and exchanged a few shots with HMS Tigre and Leviathan. Captain Senez, of Borée, planned to anchor off Sète, but Ensign Vallat, captain of the aviso Provençale, which was patrolling the area, offered to pilot Borée into the harbour. The manœuver succeeded, putting Borée out of reach of the British squadron. Pauline mirrored the actions of Borée and also entered the port.

With the sea growing heavier, the British stayed off Baudin's ships, but Robuste and Lion were sustaining increasing damage and leaking water. It soon became obvious that the ships could not be raised, and would have to be abandoned and scuttled. Charles Louis Joseph de Gau de Frégeville, the commander of the local national guard, requisitioned boats and mobilised national guards from Montpellier to assist in rescue operations. In the early morning of the 26th, Frégeville went on Robuste to confer with Baudin and offer assistance, and they decided to set a battery on the shore and light fires, as to deter an assault by British boats. They started evacuating the crew and stripping the ships from all useful equipment. In the afternoon, the British ships closed in and launched boats; the French fired on them with four- and six-pounder field guns that Frégeville had had installed aft of Robuste, and launched their own boats to engage the British party. At 18:30, Baudin signaled that he was about to set his ships on fire. Robuste and Lion exploded in the night.

On 1 November, British cutting out parties from HMS Tigre, Cumberland, Apollo, Topaze, Volontaire, Scout, Philomel and Ronco, attacked the convoy anchored at Baie des Roses. The transports were protected by the 18-gun fluyt Lamproie, (Note: Also written Lamproye (Roche, p. 273.)) under Captain Jacques Labretesche, (Note: Also written "Jacques de la Bretesche",(Roche, p. 273.)) the avisos Victoire and Grondeur, and the pink Normande. (Note: Normande was a transport, previously the Sicilian pink Jésus-Maria-Saint Pierre, that the French Navy requisitioned in December 1805 and armed with six 4-pounders and four swivel guns.(Demerliac, n°1378, p. 164.)) Some of the British boats took heavy casualties in the clash. Still, they captured three merchantmen, and set ten ships on fire, including Lamproie. The aviso Victoire, under Garibou, resisted three boarding attempts before being destroyed.

== Aftermath ==
Amélie, having broken her bowsprit, escaped to Marseille and returned to Toulon on 3 November. Borée and Pauline arrived at Toulon on the 19th.

In January 1813 prize money was awarded to the British vessels that took part in the action for the capture of the ships of war Grondeur and Normande, and of the transports Dragon and Indien. A court declared Invincible a joint captor. Head money was also paid for Grondeur and Normande and for the destruction of Lamproie and Victoire. In 1847 the Admiralty awarded the Naval General Service Medal with clasp "1 Nov. Boat Service 1809" to all surviving claimants from the action.

== Order of battle ==
Rear Admiral François-André Baudin's squadron
| Ship | Rate | Guns | Navy | Commander | Casualties | | | Notes |
| Ship | Rate | Guns | Navy | Commander | Killed | Wounded | Total | Notes |
|---|---|---|---|---|---|---|---|---|
| Robuste | Bucentaure-class ship of the line | 80 | France | Captain François Legras | | | | Run aground and scuttled |
| Lion | Téméraire-class ship of the line | 74 | France | Captain Eustache-Marie-Joseph Bonamy | | | | Run aground and scuttled |
| Borée | Téméraire-class ship of the line | 74 | France | Captain Louis-André Senez | | | | Escaped to Sète |
| Calypso | Hortense-class frigate | 40 | France | Captain François-Gilles Montfort | | | | Escaped to Sète |
| Amélie | Pallas-class frigate | 40 | France | Captain Marie-Jean-François Meynard-Lafargue | | | | Escaped to Sète |
Casualties:

Vice-Admiral Cuthbert Collingwood's squadron
| Ship | Rate | Guns | Navy | Commander | Casualties | | | Notes |
| Ship | Rate | Guns | Navy | Commander | Killed | Wounded | Total | Notes |
|---|---|---|---|---|---|---|---|---|
| HMS Canopus | Tonnant-class ship of the line | 80 | | Rear-Admiral George Martin; Captain Charles Inglis | | | | |
| HMS Renown | America-class ship of the line | 74 | | Captain Philip Charles Durham | | | | |
| HMS Tigre | Téméraire-class ship of the line | 74 | | Captain Benjamin Hallowell | | | | |
| HMS Sultan | Fame-class ship of the line | 74 | | Captain Edward Griffith Colpoys | | | | |
| HMS Leviathan | Courageux-class ship of the line | 74 | | Captain John Harvey | | | | |
| HMS Cumberland | Repulse-class ship of the line | 74 | | Captain Philip Wodehouse | | | | |
Casualties:
Sources: Troude, p. 56

== Sources and references ==
Notes

External links

- Bataille navale au large de Maguelone
- 6 Anglais 4 Français

Bibliography

- Demerliac, Alain (2004). La Marine du Consulat et du Premier Empire: Nomenclature des Navires Français de 1800 à 1815 (in French). Éditions Ancre. ISBN 2-903179-30-1.
- James, William (1837), The Naval History of Great Britain, from the Declaration of War by France in 1793, to the Accession of George IV., R. Bentley
- Quintin, Danielle; Quintin, Bernard (2003). Dictionnaire des capitaines de Vaisseau de Napoléon (in French). S.P.M. ISBN 2-901952-42-9.
- Roche, Jean-Michel (2005). Dictionnaire des bâtiments de la flotte de guerre française de Colbert à nos jours [Dictionary of French Warships from Colbert to Today]. Vol. 1: 1671-1870. Roche. ISBN 978-2-9525917-0-6. OCLC 165892922.
- Troude, Onésime-Joachim (1867). Batailles navales de la France (in French). Vol. 4. Challamel ainé. pp. 56–58.
