= French ship Borée (1805) =

Ship of the line of the French Navy

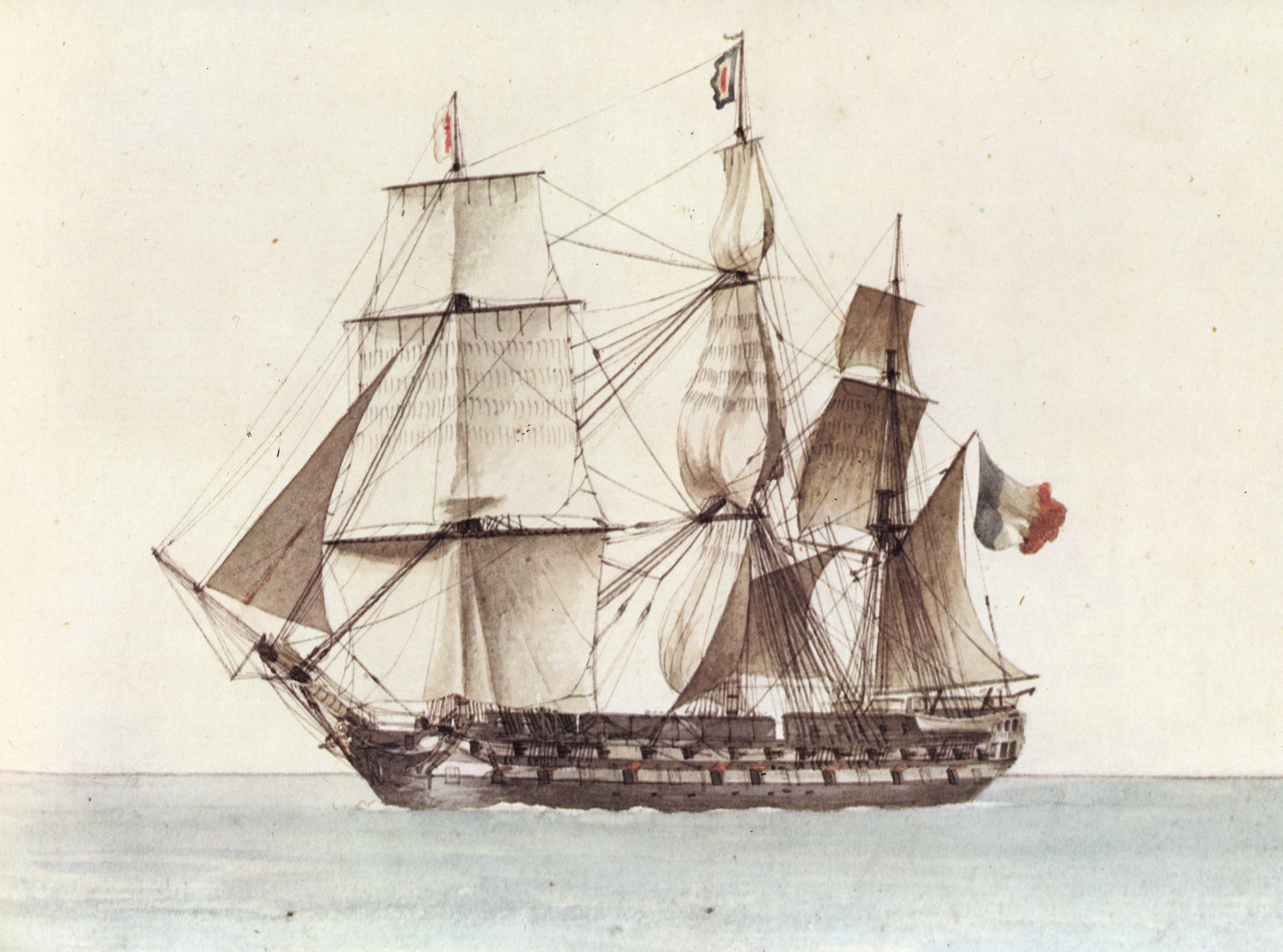
- Portrait of Borée on 12 April 1807, by Antoine Roux

History

France
- Name: Borée
- Namesake: Boreas
- Ordered: 4 January 1803
- Builder: Toulon
- Laid down: 19 August 1803
- Launched: 27 June 1805
- Commissioned: 29 May 1805
- Stricken: 1828
- Fate: Broken up in 1828

General characteristics
- Class & type: Téméraire-class ship of the line
- Displacement: 2,781 tonneaux
- Tons burthen: 1,381 port tonneaux
- Length: 54 m (177 ft 2 in)
- Beam: 14.3 m (46 ft 11 in)
- Draught: 6.7 m (22 ft 0 in)
- Propulsion: Up to 2,485 m^{2} (26,750 sq ft) of sails
- Complement: 678 men
- Armament: 74 guns: Lower gundeck: 28 × 36-pounder long guns; Upper gundeck: 30 × 24-pounder long guns; Forecastle and Quarter deck: 16 × 8-pounder long guns; 4 × 36-pounder carronades

Borée was a 74-gun Téméraire-class ship of the line built for the French Navy during the first decade of the 19th century.

== Design and construction ==
Designed based on plans by Jacques-Noël Sané, and updated by Maillot, she and her sister (Pluton) were the prototypes of a new variant of the Téméraire class designed to have a smaller draught, allowing the production of ships of the line in the shallow harbour of Antwerp.

The construction of Borée was delayed due to a lack of timber, causing her completion date to fall behind that of Pluton, a sistership then under construction. Borée was retro-fitted with improvements introduced on Pluton.

== Career ==
In May 1805, Borée was commissioned and Captain Louis-André Senez took command on 29 August. She was part of the Mediterranean squadron under Vice-Admiral Ganteaume, in Toulon.

From February to April 1808, Borée took part in Ganteaume's expedition to Corfu.

In April 1809, she took part in the escort of a convoy to Barcelona, in a division under Rear-Admiral Cosmao.

In October 1809, she resumed escort duties for a convoy to Barcelona, this time in a division under Rear-Admiral Baudin. The fleet departed Toulon on the 21st. In the morning of the 23rd, the convoy was intercepted by a British squadron under Admiral Collingwood; Baudin ordered the convoy to escape to the bay of Roses, while the escort attempted to distract the British. By noon, fourteen British ships were chasing the three French ships of the line and two frigates. In the morning of 24th, the French squadron anchored close to the coast; it departed the next day at 5, and Baudin gave his captains liberty of manoeuvre to negotiate the shallow waters.

Borée reached deep waters, accompanied by the frigate Pauline, and was chased by HMS Tigre and Leviathan; the running Battle of Maguelone ensued, Senes attempting to moor his ship off Sète. The aviso Provençale had witnessed the fight and her captain, Ensign Vallat, proposed to lead Borée into the harbour of Sète. The delicate manoeuvre succeeded, putting Borée out of reach of the British squadron. Borée and Pauline returned to Toulon, where they arrived on 19 November.

In 1811, Borée remained in Toulon with the Mediterranean squadron, under Senez. On 18 November 1812, Captain Jean-Michel Mahé took command of Borée, part of the squadron commanded by Vice-Admiral Émeriau. He captained Borée during the action of 5 November 1813 and until her decommissioning on 13 June 1814.

Borée remained decommissioned in Toulon until 1828, when she was struck and broken up.

== Notes and references ==
=== Bibliography ===
- Roche, Jean-Michel (2005). Dictionnaire des bâtiments de la flotte de guerre française de Colbert à nos jours, 1671–1870. Group Retozel-Maury Millau. p. 79. ISBN 978-2-9525917-0-6. OCLC 165892922.
- Quintin, Danielle et Bernard (2003). Dictionnaire des capitaines de Vaisseau de Napoléon. S.P.M. ISBN 2-901952-42-9.
- Fonds Marine. Campagnes (opérations; divisions et stations navales; missions diverses). Inventaire de la sous-série Marine BB4. Tome deuxième : BB4 1 à 482 (1790-1826)
- Troude, Onésime-Joachim (1867). Batailles navales de la France. Vol. 4. Challamel ainé.
- Winfield, Rif and Roberts, Stephen S. (2015) French Warships in the Age of Sail 1786-1861: Design, Construction, Careers and Fates. Seaforth Publishing. ISBN 978-1-84832-204-2
