= HMS Kingfisher (1804) =

Sloop of the Royal Navy

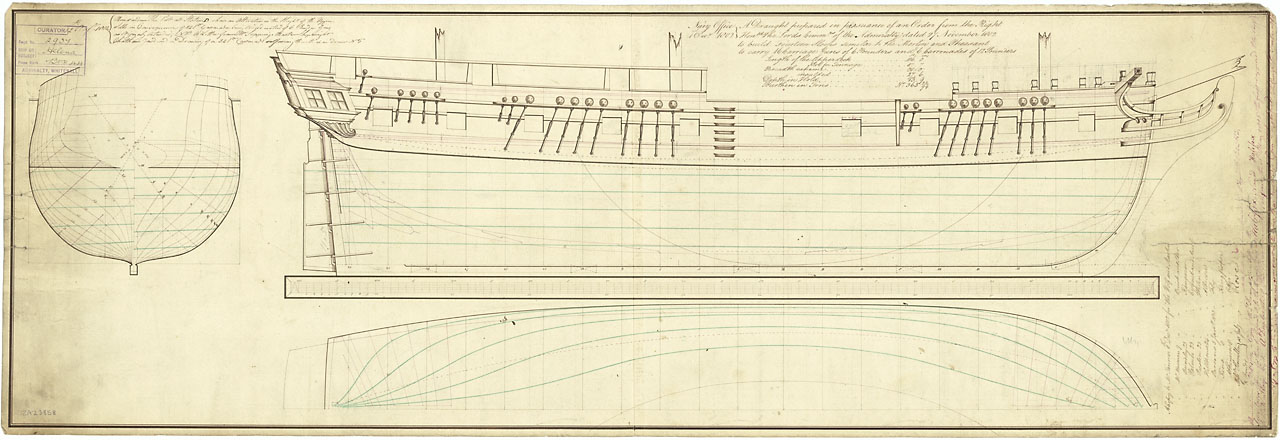
- Kingfisher

History

UK
- Name: HMS Kingfisher
- Namesake: Alcedo atthis, the common kingfisher
- Ordered: 27 November 1802
- Builder: Thomas King of Dover
- Laid down: March 1803
- Launched: 10 March 1804
- Commissioned: 3 May 1804 at Sheerness
- Honours and awards: Naval General Service Medal with clasp "St. Domingo"
- Fate: Broken up October 1816 at Portsmouth

General characteristics
- Class & type: Ship sloop
- Tons burthen: 365 32/94 (bm)
- Length: 106 ft (32.3 m) (gundeck); 87 ft 7 in (26.7 m) (keel)
- Beam: 28 ft (8.5 m)
- Depth of hold: 13 ft 9 in (4.2 m)
- Sail plan: Full-rigged ship
- Complement: 121
- Armament: 16 × 32-pounder carronades; 2 × 6-pounder chase guns

HMS Kingfisher (or King's Fisher or Kingsfisher) was a Royal Navy 18-gun ship sloop, built by John King and launched in 1804 at Dover. She served during the Napoleonic Wars, first in the Caribbean and then in the Mediterranean before being broken up in 1816.

== Caribbean ==
Commander Richard William Cribb commissioned Kingfisher in April 1804. On 17 July 1804, she escorted a convoy from Cork to the Leeward Islands and initially she operated from Barbados.

In January King's Fisher captured the French privateer schooner Deux Amis. She was pierced for eight guns but only had two on board at the time of her capture, having thrown the others overboard as she tried to escape her pursuers. She had a crew of 39 men, under the command of Francis Dutrique. She was ten days out of Guadeloupe and had captured nothing. Cribb credited His Majesty's schooner Grenada with having chased Deux Amis into his hands. Furthermore, when Grenada's commander saw that Kingfisher would capture Deux Amis, he chased and recaptured the sloop Hero.

On 11 April 1805, her boats cut out the Spanish privateer Damas from an anchorage under Cape St. Juan. She was pierced for four guns but only mounted one 8-pounder. She also carried 40 muskets for her crew of 57 men. Damas had left Cumaná, Venezuela, ten days earlier for a cruise off Demerara on what was her first cruise, but had captured nothing. She put up a little resistance and there was gunfire from the shore, but Kingsfisher suffered no casualties. In April 1826 head money for the capture of the Deux Amis and the Damas was finally paid.

On 27 June, when about 180 miles to north-east of Barbuda, Kingfisher, Captain Richard William Cribb, and Osprey, Captain Timothy Clinch, found themselves being chased by French frigates. While making sail to escape, the two sloops hoisted signals and fired guns, as if signaling to a fleet ahead. Their pursuers immediately gave up the chase, which gave Kingfisher and Osprey the opportunity to catch up with a group of 15 French merchant vessels with cargoes of rum, sugar and coffee. The two British sloops left all 15 merchantmen in flames.

Cribb died in June 1805. From July Kingfisher was under the command of Commander Nathaniel Day Cochrane.

On 16 December Kingfisher captured the French privateer Elisabeth, out of Guadaloupe after a 12-hour chase. Elizabeth was armed with ten 6-pounder guns and four 9-pounder carronades. She had a crew of 102, but 11 men were away in Cambrian, which Elizabeth had captured after Cambrian had left a convoy on 28 October. Cambrian had been carrying a cargo of coal from Cork to Jamaica; HMS Melville recaptured Cambrian. Cochrane noted that Elizabeth was a fine vessel, well worth taking into the Royal Navy, which advice the Navy took, commissioning her as HMS Elizabeth.

Also that day Kingfisher and Hyaena captured a Spanish polacca sailing to Vera Cruz with merchandise. On 28 December Kingsfisher and Heureux captured the Spanish merchant brig Solidad, which was carrying brandy and wine from Cadiz to Vera Cruz.

In 1806, Kingfisher was attached to the British squadron under Admiral Sir John Thomas Duckworth. On 1 February she brought intelligence that a French squadron of three sail of the line had been seen steering towards the city of Santo Domingo. Duckworth gathered his squadron and on 6 February met the French in the Battle of San Domingo. Kingfisher was highly commended for her services in the aftermath of the action, with Cochrane being promoted to Post-captain. In 1807 Kingfisher shared with the rest of Duckworth's squadron in the prize money for the capture of the Alexander, Jupiter and Brave. In 1847 the Admiralty would issue to any surviving crew members that claimed it the Naval General Service Medal with clasp "St. Domingo".

George Francis Seymour, who had been severely wounded while serving in Northumberland in the battle of San Domingo, succeeded Cochrane. Kingfisher then sailed for the Channel.

== European theatre ==
On 14 May Kingfisher towed Pallas after Pallas had rammed Minerve in the Basque Roads.

In July, Seymour was posted into Aurora and Commander William Hepenstall took command of Kingfisher. On 27 September she was with Admiral Sir Thomas Louis's squadron when the 40-gun French frigate Président surrendered to the 18-gun Cruizer-class brig-sloop Dispatch, assisted by the 74-gun third rate Canopus and the frigate Blanche.

In October, Hepenstall sailed Kingsfisher to the Mediterranean. Here, she was operating off the Turkish coast near Karaman, when on 27 June 1808 she captured the French letter of marque Hercule after a six-hour chase and an hour-long fight. Hercule, under Gerome Cavassa (a member of the Legion of Honour), was carrying a cargo of cotton from Aleppo and Cyprus to Marseilles or Genoa. She was armed with 12 guns, ranging in size from 8-pounders to 18-pounders. Her crew numbered 57 men, of whom one was killed and two were wounded. Kingfisher suffered extensive damage to her rigging but had only one man slightly wounded. (Note: The capture earned Hepenstall £47 1s 8 3/4d in prize money; an able seaman received 6s 1d.)

In 1809, under Commander Ewell Tritton, on 12 March she was in company with the 38-gun fifth-rate frigate Topaze when Topaze engaged in an inconclusive action during the Adriatic campaign of 1807–1814 with the 40-gun Flore and the 44-gun Danaé. Topaze sustained no casualties or meaningful damage.

On 1 October Kingfisher joined a squadron off Zante. On 3 October a British force under General John Oswald and Commodore John W. Spranger captured the port, followed by Cephalonia, Ithaca, Santa Maura, and Cerigo. On board around this time was the adventurer Thomas Sutcliffe. While Kingfisher was in the area she captured a number of vessels bound for Corfu. Tritton put Sutcliffe on board one as prize master. Bad weather forced Sutcliffe to shelter on 30 October at the island of Melira. There he and his men were captured, after they had scuttled the prize. Sutcliffe later managed to escape to Albania. (Note: While in Chile may years later, Sutcliffe told the tale of his escape to a French naval captain, who turned out to have been a lieutenant on Flore.)

In 1810, a midshipman from Kingfisher, together with a corporal of marines and four boys, captured a trabaccolo that turned out to have some 100 French soldiers aboard. Kingfisher conveyed them to Malta.

In 1811, Kingfisher was in the Adriatic, participating indirectly in the action of 29 November 1811 when Active captured Pomone. Kingsfisher came up after the fighting was over and took Pomone in tow. Later, Kingfisher shared in the prize money.

On 29 January 1813 Kingfisher was in company with Cerberus when they captured Madona della Grazia. Prize money was paid in April 1838. (Note: Tritton was entitled to £19 17s 10 3/4d; an ordinary seaman was entitled to 5s 10 1/2d.)

2 February 1813, after a five-hour chase, her boats captured one trabaccolo and ran nine ashore at St. Catherine's, Corfu, of which five were destroyed. Kingfisher lost two men killed and seven severely wounded.

On 27 May 1813, Kingsfisher was at Port Slano (Croatia). There she destroyed three vessels and took six, laden with grain and wine for Ragussa.

== Fate ==
Between 1814 and 1816, Kingfisher was placed in ordinary at Portsmouth. She was broken up in October 1816.
