= Martha (1810 ship) =

Ship launched at Quebec in 1810

History

United Kingdom
- Name: Martha
- Owner: Quebec City, Quebec
- Builder: Blackett & Co.
- Launched: 13 September 1810
- Fate: Broken up 1820

General characteristics
- Tons burthen: 410, 41084/9, or 411 (bm)
- Propulsion: Sail
- Armament: 6 × 9-pounder guns

Martha was launched at Quebec in 1810 and transferred her registry to Great Britain in 1811. In 1818 she transported convicts to Port Jackson, New South Wales. She remained in the South Pacific as a whaler until she was condemned in 1820 as unseaworthy and then sold for breaking up.

== Career ==
Martha entered Lloyd's Register in 1811 with J. Wilson, master, and trade London—Grenada. She transferred her registry to London on 6 February 1811. She then continued to trade with Grenada for some years.

The 1818 volume of Lloyd's Register showed Martha's master as changing from Driver to J.Apsey, and her trade as London—India. However, on 18 August 1818 Martha left Cork, bound for New South Wales. She was under the command of Captain John Apsey and her surgeon was Morgan Price. She arrived at Port Jackson on 24 December. She had embarked 170 male convicts, none of whom died en route. Lieutenant Cockerill commanded the guard, which consisted of 32 men of the 67th and 87th Regiments of Foot.

Apsey had Martha refitted for whale fishing. She left Sydney on 1 March 1819. She arrived at Hobart on 18 September, after having been whaling for some time. She was to leave in a week for the coasts of New Zealand to gather sperm oil. By 21 December, when she arrived at the Bay of Islands in New Zealand, she already was nearly full. However, within a few days Apsey went out for more whales.

== Fate ==
On 29 May 1820, Martha arrived at Port Jackson in distress, following “boisterous weather”. She was surveyed in June and condemned as unseaworthy. She was sold for breaking up in August. The whaler Tuscan, Captain Coleman (or Colman), undertook to carry Martha's oil back to London. Lloyd's List reported on 6 February 1821 that Tuscan had arrived in the Thames with the cargo from Martha.
