= Thomas Sutcliffe (soldier) =

Thomas Sutcliffe (c. 1790 – 22 April 1849) was an English soldier of fortune. After periods in the Royal Navy and then as an army officer involved in the Battle of Waterloo, he became an army officer in the service of Colombia and then Chile. In later years he was a writer.

== Life ==
Thomas Sutcliffe was a son of John Sutcliffe of Stansfield, near Halifax, Yorkshire, and great-grandson of John Kay, the inventor of the flying shuttle.

He entered the Royal Navy, and was on board HMS Kingfisher in the blockade of Corfu in 1809; he was captured by the enemy, but managed to escape to Albania. He afterwards held a commission in the Royal Horse Guards, and was with his regiment at the battle of Waterloo, where he was severely wounded.

In 1817 he formed one of a band of adventurous Englishmen who went out to Colombia to aid those fighting for independence from Spain, and was appointed lieutenant-colonel of cavalry in the army of the republic. Here again he was made a prisoner of war, and was detained at Havana. He returned to England in 1821. He set out again for South America in August of the following year, and offered his services to the republic of Chile; he received the appointment of captain of cavalry.

For sixteen years Sutcliffe remained in the military service of the republic, and took part in the operations of the liberating army in Peru. In 1834 he was appointed political and military governor of the island of Juan Fernandez, then used as a convict station by Chile.

He witnessed the destructive earthquake there in February 1835, when he lost most of his possessions. Shortly afterwards an insurrection took place on the island, and Sutcliffe was recalled.

Eventually, through a change of administration, he was cashiered in March 1838, and he returned to England in January 1839. He had slender means, since heavy claims for arrears of pay remained unsettled. He tried to improve his circumstances by writing. After living in the neighbourhood of Manchester, Sutcliffe moved to London in about 1846, and died in poverty in lodgings on 22 April 1849, aged 59.

== Publications ==
- The Earthquake at Juan Fernandez, as it occurred in the year 1835 (Manchester, 1839)
- Foreign Loans, or Information to all connected with the Republic of Chili, comprising the Epoch from 1822 to 1839 (Manchester, 1840)
- Sixteen Years in Chile and Peru, from 1822 to 1839 (London, 1841)
- Crusoniana; or Truth versus Fiction, elucidated in a History of the Islands of Juan Fernandez (Manchester, 1843)
- An Exposition of Facts relating to the Rise and Progress of the Woollen, Linen, and Cotton Manufactures of Great Britain (Manchester, 1843)
- A Testimonial in behalf of Merit neglected and Genius unrewarded, and Record of the Services of one of England's greatest Benefactors, by a desendant of John Kay of Bury (London, 1847)

The last two works were published in order to obtain public support for the descendants of John Kay, for which he worked unsuccessfully for several years.
