= Tropea Castle =

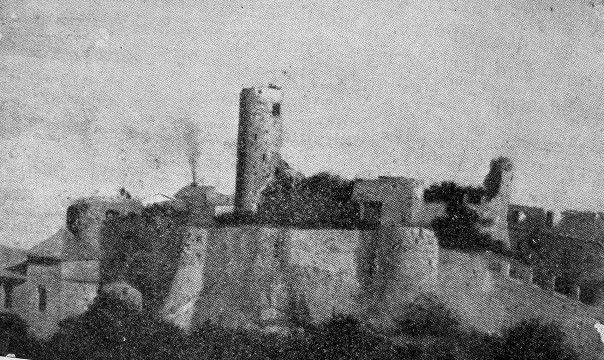
The only known daguerreotype of Tropea castle prior to its destruction in 1876

Tropea Castle was a castle in Tropea in Vibo Valentia province of Calabria in southern Italy. In 1725, one of four towers of the castle was damaged, and the entire castle was finally destroyed in 1876, by Carlo Toraldo with explosives. On 8 July 1806, during the Napoleonic Wars, 400 Polish soldiers surrendered at Tropea Castle to the captain of HMS Apollo.
