= HMS Bermuda (1795) =

14-gun brig-sloops of the Royal Navy

History

Great Britain
- Name: HMS Bermuda
- Namesake: British colony of Bermuda
- Launched: 1795
- Commissioned: 1795
- Fate: Disappeared in September 1796 in the Gulf of Florida

General characteristics
- Armament: 14 guns

HMS Bermuda was a 14-gun brig-sloop built in Bermuda, which was purchased and commissioned by the Royal Navy in 1795, the first Royal Navy ship of her name. She disappeared in September 1796 in the Gulf of Florida.

The Royal Kalendar or, Complete and Correct Annual Register for England, Scotland, Ireland, and America. For the Year 1797 List of Kings Ships now in Commission records her as 38 Bermuda, T. Maxtone.
