= HMS Leviathan (1790) =

Ship of the line of the Royal Navy

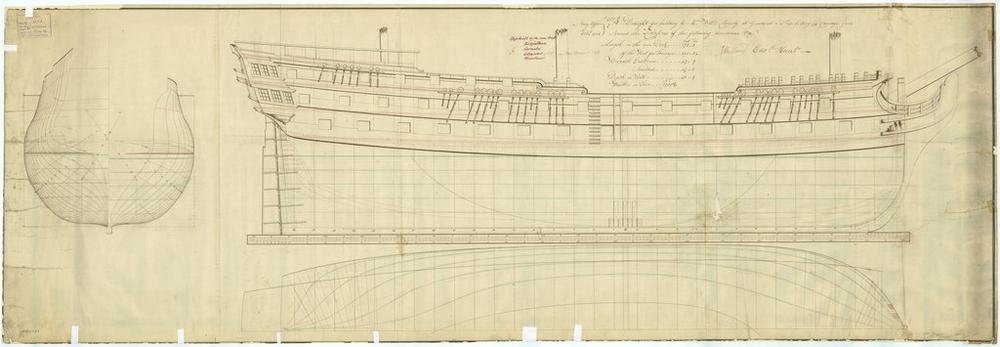
- Leviathan (1790)

History

Great Britain
- Name: HMS Leviathan
- Ordered: 9 December 1779
- Builder: Chatham Dockyard
- Laid down: May 1782
- Launched: 9 October 1790
- Honours and awards: Participated in: Battle of Trafalgar
- Fate: Sold and broken up, 1848

General characteristics
- Class & type: Courageux-class ship of the line
- Tons burthen: 1,70789/94 (bm)
- Length: 172 ft 3 in (52.50 m) (gundeck)
- Beam: 47 ft 9 in (14.55 m)
- Depth of hold: 20 ft 9 1/2 in (6.3 m)
- Propulsion: Sails
- Sail plan: Full-rigged ship
- Armament: 74 guns: Gundeck: 28 × 32 pdrs; Upper gundeck: 28 × 18 pdrs; Quarterdeck: 14 × 9 pdrs; Forecastle: 4 × 9 pdrs

HMS Leviathan was a 74-gun third-rate ship of the line of the British Royal Navy, launched on 9 October 1790.

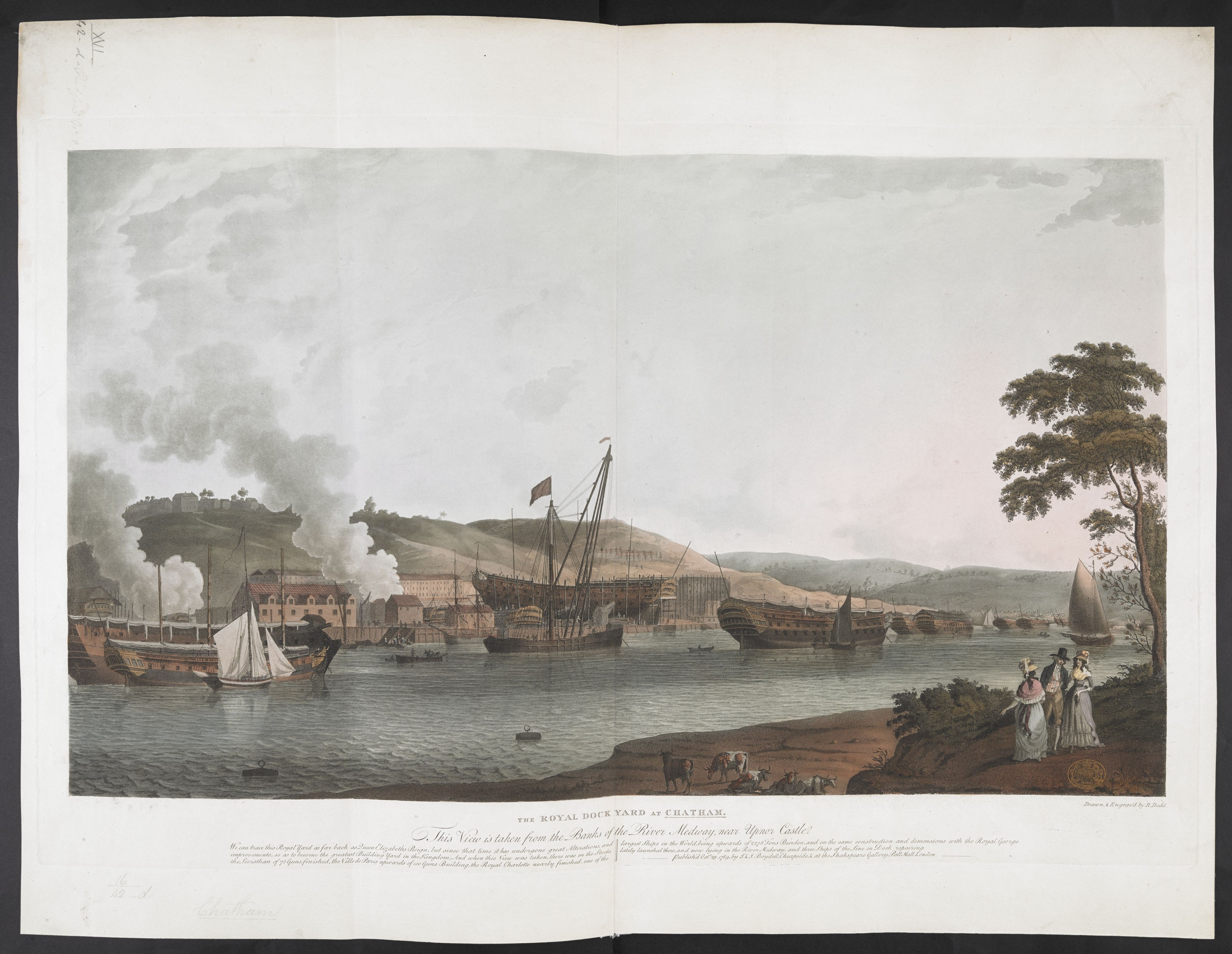
Leviathan on the stocks, finished, at the Royal Dockyard Chatham, 1789

== Service history ==
At the Battle of Trafalgar under Henry William Bayntun, she was near the front of the windward column led by Admiral Lord Nelson aboard his flagship, HMS Victory, and captured the Spanish ship San Agustín. A flag said to have been flown by the Leviathan at Trafalgar is to be sold at auction by Arthur Cory in March 2016 - Bayntun is thought to have given it to his friend the Duke of Clarence (later William IV), who then gave it to Arthur Cory's direct ancestor Nicholas Cory, a senior officer on William's royal yacht HMS Royal Sovereign, in thanks for helping the yacht win a race and a bet.

Leviathan, Pompee, Anson, Melpomene, and Childers shared in the proceeds of the capture on 10 September 1797 of the Tordenskiold.

In 1809, she took part in the Battle of Maguelone.

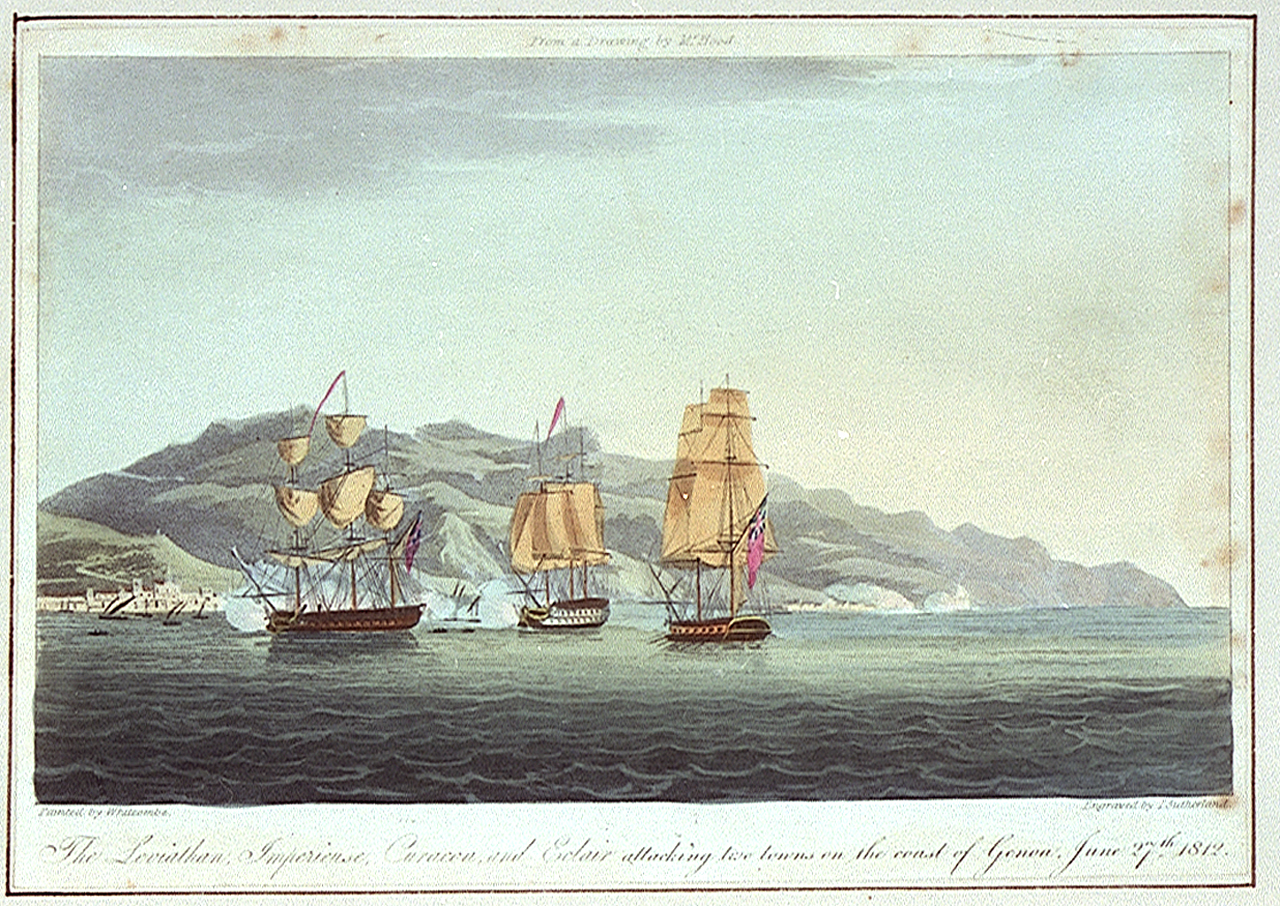
Attack on convoy of eighteen French merchant ships at Laigrelia, 1812

On 27 June 1812, Leviathan, Imperieuse, Curacoa and Eclair attacked an 18-strong French convoy at Laigueglia and Alassio in Liguria, northern Italy.

== Fate ==
In 1816, after the end of the Napoleonic Wars, she was converted into a prison ship and in 1848 was sold and broken up.
