= Trabaccolo =

Type of sailing vessel

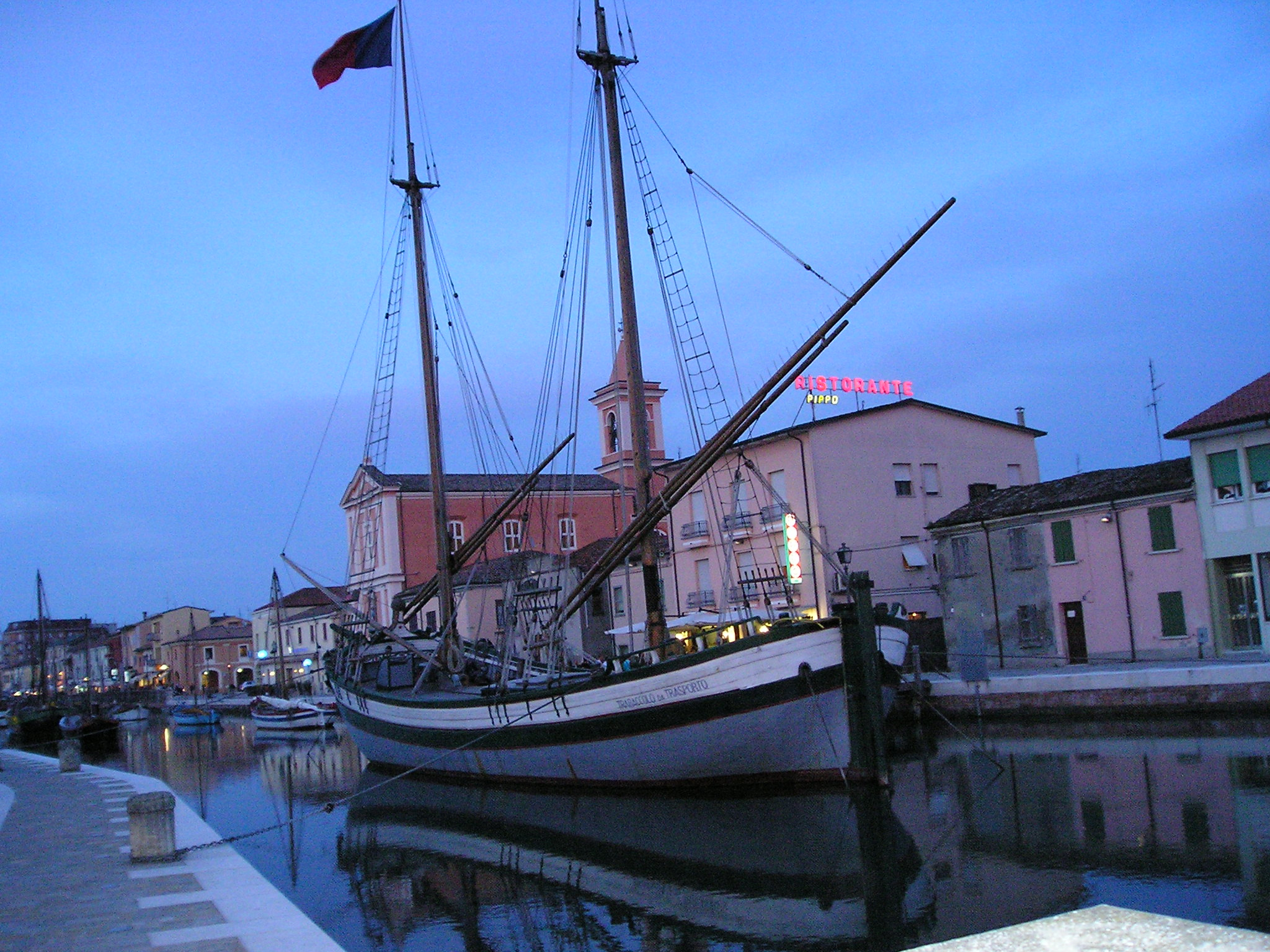
A modern trabàccolo in Cesenatico, Italy

The trabàccolo, trabaccalo, trabacalo (in Italian) or trabakul (in Croatian), is a type of sailing coastal trading vessel used in the Adriatic Sea. The name comes from the word trabacca, which means tent, which in turn recalls the vessel's sails. The trabàccolo was a typical Venetian boat-form that dates back to the first half of the 15th century and that spread throughout the Adriatic. Built of oak and larch, trabàccoli were slow but reliable cargo vessels ranging between 50 and 200 deadweight tons. They had round bows and sterns, and were wide, compact, and with good stowage. Other characteristics included a large rudder that extended below the depth of the keel, two masts with lug sails and rigging, a bowsprit, and a carved and colorfully painted stern. The usual such vessel was about 20 metres long, with a breadth equal to about a third of the length. Typically a trabàccolo would have a crew of 10 to 20 sailors.

Today, the Marine Museum of Cesenatico (Museo della Marineria di Cesenatico) has a restored, functioning trabàccolo, the Barchet, which participates in sailing events during the summer.

== History ==
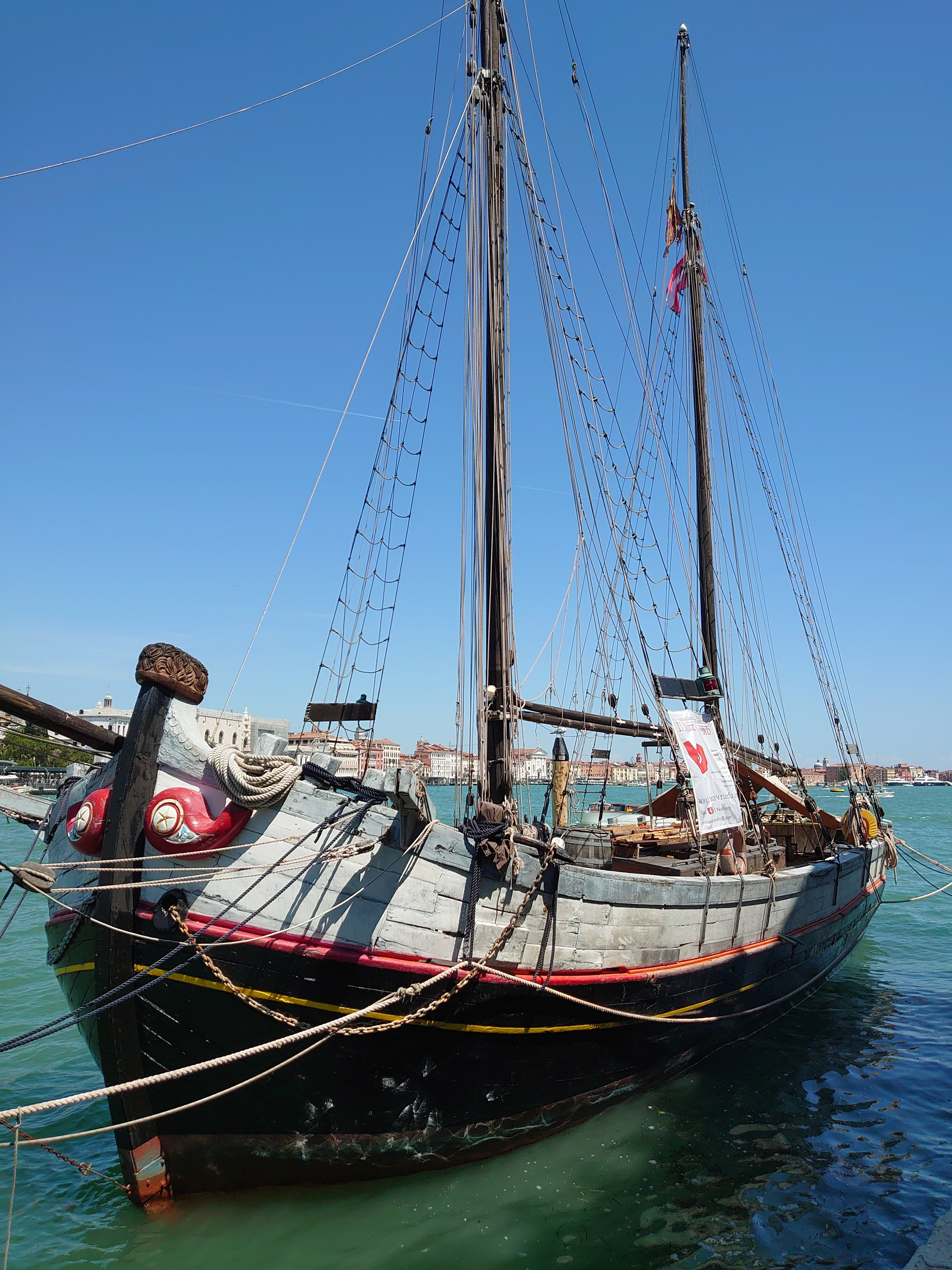
The trabaccolo Il Nuovo Trionfo moored in Venice

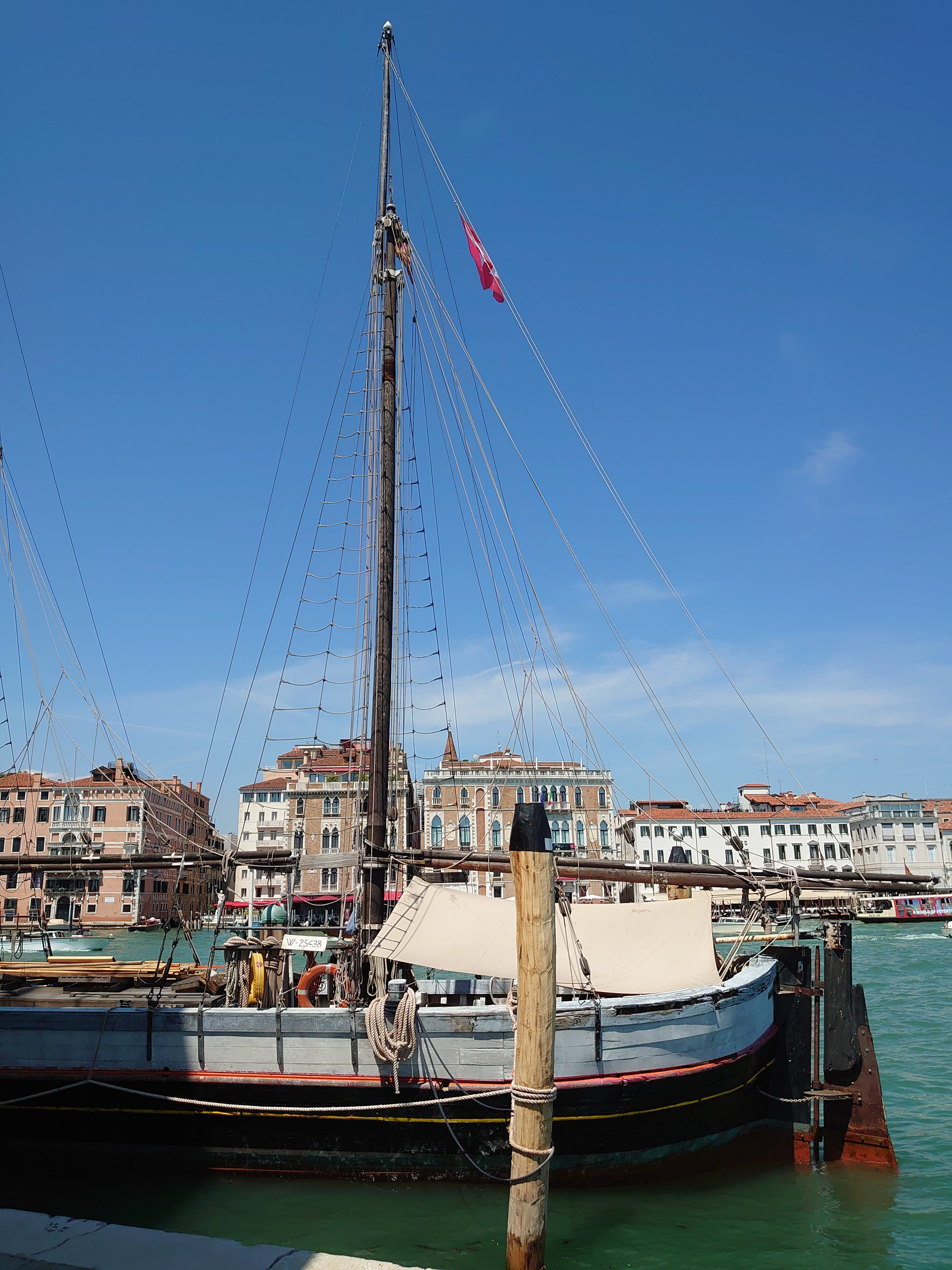
Stern of the trabaccolo Il Nuovo Trionfo showing the large rudder

During the late 18th and early 19th centuries, it was common for trabàccoli to carry some armament in the form of two or three cannons. The vessels were not only prey to pirates and privateers, but also were fair game for naval vessels seeking prizes.

During the French Revolutionary and Napoleonic Wars, Royal Navy vessels cruising around Italy often captured trabàccoli. The 14-gun cutter {{[HMS |Pigmy |1794|6}} captured several. On 17 January 1800 she captured the Imperial trabaccolo Divine Providence, which was carrying a cargo of rope from Cesenatico to France. On 18 February 1801, off the island of Lafrina, Pigmy captured Adelaide, a French privateer trabàccolo armed with two 12-pounders and one 6-pounder cannon, and carrying a crew of 51 men. A former fishing vessel, she was under the command of Dominique Cannilla and was seven days out from Ancona. She had taken one small prize. On 15 March, Pigmy encountered yet another trabàccolo off the Isle of Lonzo. Pigmy chased the vessel to the Isle of Molata where the quarry anchored and hoisted French colours. When Pigmy fired a shot, the French vessel struck. She turned out to be the privateer Achille, armed with four 9-pounder and six 2-pounder guns, and carrying a crew of 44 men. Achille was under the command of Francisco Bruni, had only been out of Ancona for one day, and had made no captures.

On 25 October 1807, the 20-gun, sixth rate HMS Herald was off Otranto when she found an armed trabàccolo anchored under the fortress there. Under fire from both the vessel and the shore, a boat party from Herald cut-out the vessel, which turned out to be the French privateer Caesar, armed with four 6-pounder guns. Caesar was sailing from Ancona to Corfu with a cargo of rice and flour. British casualties were four men wounded.

On 21 December 1812, the 38-gun frigate HMS Apollo, Captain Bridges Watkinson Taylor commanding, accompanied by the brig-sloop HMS Weazel, chased a trabàccolo under the protection of the tower of San Cataldo, on the coast between Brindisi and Otranto. The boats of the two vessels captured the tower and blew it up. The trabàccolo had three guns and three swivel guns, but no cargo, and the men from the boats blew it up too.

On 2 February 1813, after a two-hour chase, the boats of the 18-gun sloop HMS Kingfisher captured one trabàccolo and ran nine ashore at St. Catherine's, Corfu. Musket fire from the heights and cannon fire from a battery killed two British sailors and severely wounded seven.

On 22 Mar 1813, boats from HMS Havannah captured a large trabàccolo armed with three 9-pounder guns, and burnt a similar one laden with oil, off the town of Vasto. On the 26th, boats from Havannah captured five armed trabaccoli and five feluccas laden with salt, near the town of Fortore. These operations cost Havannah only two men wounded.
