= French ship Lion (1804) =

Ship of the line of the French Navy

- Scale model of Achille, sister ship of French ship Lion (1804), on display at the Musée national de la Marine in Paris.

History

France
- Name: Lion
- Builder: Rochefort, Charente-Maritime
- Laid down: 30 June 1802
- Launched: 12 January 1804
- Fate: Scuttled and burnt on 26 October 1809

General characteristics
- Class & type: Téméraire-class ship of the line
- Displacement: 3,069 tonneaux
- Tons burthen: 1,537 port tonneaux
- Length: 55.87 m (183 ft 4 in)
- Beam: 14.46 m (47 ft 5 in)
- Draught: 7.15 m (23.5 ft)
- Depth of hold: 7.15 m (23 ft 5 in)
- Sail plan: Full-rigged ship
- Crew: 705
- Armament: 74 guns: Lower gun deck: 28 × 36 pdr guns; Upper gun deck: 30 × 18 pdr guns; Forecastle and Quarterdeck: 16 × 8 pdr guns

Lion was a 74-gun Téméraire-class ship of the line built for the French Navy during the 1790s. Completed in 1804, she played a minor role in the Napoleonic Wars.

== Description ==
Designed by Jacques-Noël Sané, the Téméraire-class ships had a length of 55.87 metres (183 ft 4 in), a beam of 14.46 metres (47 ft 5 in) and a depth of hold of 7.15 metres (23 ft 5 in). The ships displaced 3,069 tonneaux and had a mean draught of 7.15 metres (23 ft 5 in). They had a tonnage of 1,537 port tonneaux. Their crew numbered 705 officers and ratings during wartime. They were fitted with three masts and ship rigged.

The muzzle-loading, smoothbore armament of the Téméraire class consisted of twenty-eight 36-pounder long guns on the lower gun deck and thirty 18-pounder long guns on the upper gun deck. On the quarterdeck and forecastle were a total of sixteen 8-pounder long guns. Beginning with the ships completed after 1787, the armament of the Téméraires began to change with the addition of four 36-pounder obusiers on the poop deck (dunette). Some ships had instead twenty 8-pounders.

== Construction and career ==
Lion was laid down on 8 July 1802 at the Arsenal de Rochefort and launched on 11 February 1804. The ship was commissioned on 10 May and completed in June. She took part in Allemand's expedition of 1805 under Captain Eleonore-Jean-Nicolas Soleil. The ship was paid off on 31 March 1807 and was reactivated on 1 June 1808. On 21 October 1809, Lion departed Toulon escorting a convoy bound to Barcelona. Six days into the journey, she encountered a British squadron sent by Admiral Cuthbert Collingwood, which gave chase. In the ensuing Battle of Maguelone, Lion ran aground near Sète, and was set on fire by her crew to avoid capture.
