= French frigate Volontaire (1796) =

French naval ship

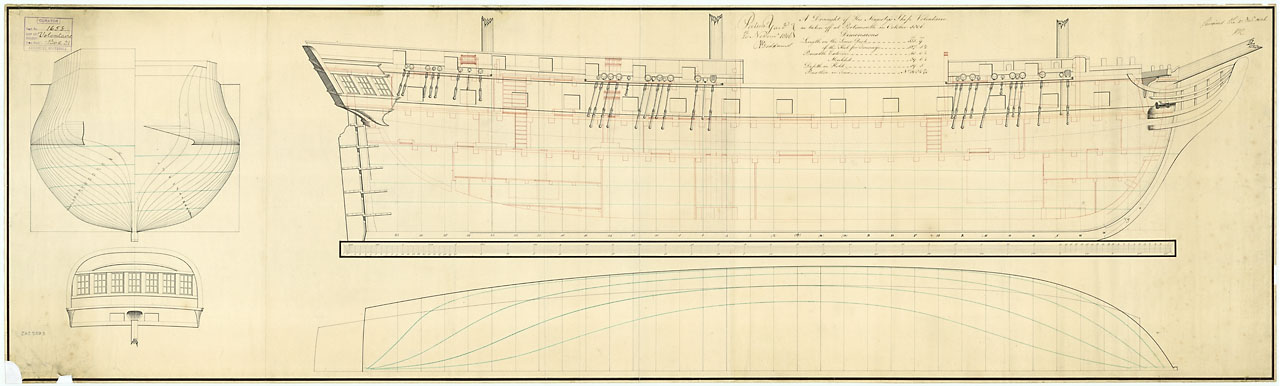
- Volontaire

History

France
- Name: Volontaire
- Builder: Bordeaux
- Laid down: September 1794
- Launched: 7 June 1796
- Fate: Captured by the British Navy on 4 March 1806, becoming HMS Volontaire

General characteristics
- Class & type: Virginie-class frigate
- Displacement: 1,390 tonneaux
- Tons burthen: 720 port tonneaux
- Length: 47.4 m (156 ft)
- Beam: 11.9 m (39 ft)
- Draught: 5.5 m (18 ft)
- Armament: 40 guns(though pierced for 44 guns)
- Armour: Timber

Volontaire was a 40-gun Virginie-class frigate of the French Navy.

On 20 November 1798, along with Insurgente, Volontaire, under Captain Laurent, captured the 14-gun corvette USS Retaliation.

She took part in the Atlantic campaign of 1806 and was captured by HMS Diadem on 4 March 1806. She sailed into Table Bay, unaware that the British had captured Cape Town. Diadem, flying a Dutch flag, came alongside. When Diadem ran up the British flag, Volontaire surrendered. (Note: In July 1810 there was a distribution of money for the capture of two French vessels taken at the Cape of Good Hope, Rolla on 21 February and Volontaire on 4 March: A petty officer's share of the prize money for Volontaire was £6 5s 0½d; an able seaman's share was £1 11s 6d. For Rolla the amounts were 15s 0½d and 3s 10d.)

The Royal Navy took her into service as HMS Volontaire. Captain Josceline Percy commissioned her and sailed her to St Helena. There he took charge of a convoy for England.

The transports Anacreon and Charlotte sailed from the Cape of Good Hope on 11 March 1806 bound for France as cartels carrying Volontaire's crew.

On 21 March, Volontaire sailed as escort to 17 transports in a convoy to Great Britain carrying invalids and Dutch prisoners.

In 1809, she took part in the Battle of Maguelone.

== Fate ==
Volontaire was broken up in February 1826.
