= HMS Cumberland (1807) =

Ship of the line of the Royal Navy

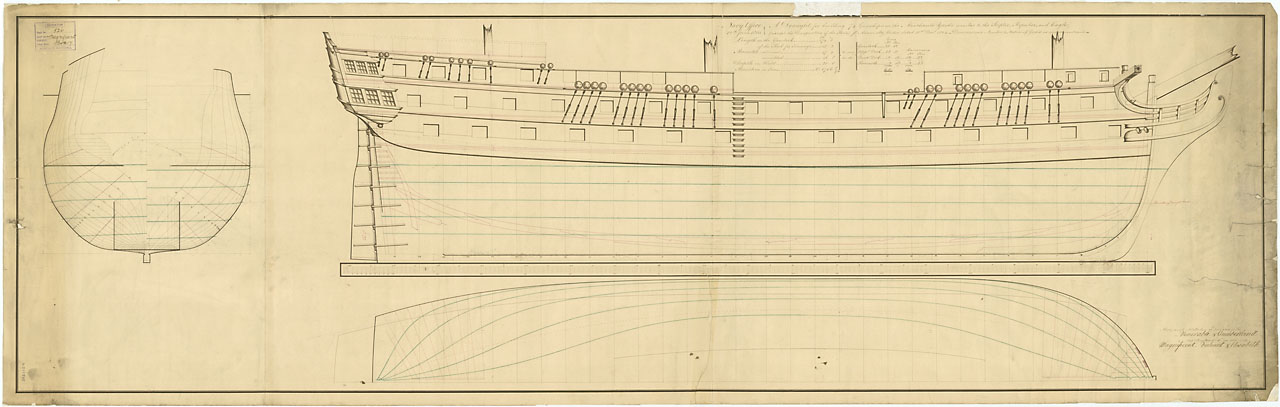
- Plan drawing of Cumberland

History

United Kingdom
- Name: Cumberland
- Ordered: 31 January 1805
- Builder: Pitcher, Northfleet
- Laid down: August 1805
- Launched: 19 August 1807
- Commissioned: October 1807
- Renamed: Fortitude, 1833
- Reclassified: As a prison ship, 1830; As a coal hulk, 1848
- Fate: Sold, 1870

General characteristics
- Class & type: Repulse-class ship of the line
- Tons burthen: 1,718 16/94 (bm)
- Length: 174 ft 4 in (53.1 m) (gundeck)
- Beam: 47 ft 7 in (14.5 m)
- Draught: 17 ft 10 in (5.4 m) (light)
- Depth of hold: 20 ft (6.1 m)
- Sail plan: Full-rigged ship
- Complement: 590
- Armament: 74 muzzle-loading, smoothbore guns; Gundeck: 28 × 32 pdr guns; Upper deck: 28 × 18 pdr guns; Quarterdeck: 2 × 18 pdr guns + 12 × 32 pdr carronades; Forecastle: 2 × 18 pdr guns + 2 × 32 pdr carronades; Poop deck: 6 × 18 pdr carronades

HMS Cumberland was a 74-gun third-rate Repulse-class ship of the line built for the Royal Navy in the first decade of the 19th century. Completed in 1803, she played a minor role in the Napoleonic Wars, participating in the Battle of Maguelone in 1809.

== Description ==
Cumberland measured 174 feet 4 inches (53.1 m) on the gundeck and 143 feet 5 inches (43.7 m) on the keel. She had a beam of 47 feet 5 inches (14.5 m), a depth of hold of 20 feet (6.1 m) and had a tonnage of 1,718 16/94 tons burthen. The ship's draught was 13 feet 8 inches (4.2 m) forward and 17 feet 7 inches (5.4 m) aft at light load; fully loaded, her draught would be significantly deeper. The Repulse-class ships were armed with 74 muzzle-loading, smoothbore guns that consisted of twenty-eight 32-pounder guns on her lower gundeck and twenty-eight 18-pounder guns on her upper gundeck. Their forecastle mounted a pair of 18-pounder guns and two 32-pounder carronades. On their quarterdeck they carried two 18-pounders and a dozen 32-pounder carronades. Above the quarterdeck was their poop deck with half-a-dozen 18-pounder carronades. Their crew numbered 590 officers and ratings. The ships were fitted with three masts and ship-rigged.

== Construction and career ==
Cumberland was the seventh ship of her name to serve in the Royal Navy. She was ordered on 24 January 1805 from Thomas Pitcher as part of the second batch of five Repulse-class ships of the line designed by Sir William Rule, co-Surveyor of the Navy. The ship was laid down at his shipyard in Northfleet in August and was launched on 19 August 1807. She was commissioned by Captain Philip Wodehouse in October and was completed at Woolwich Dockyard that same month.

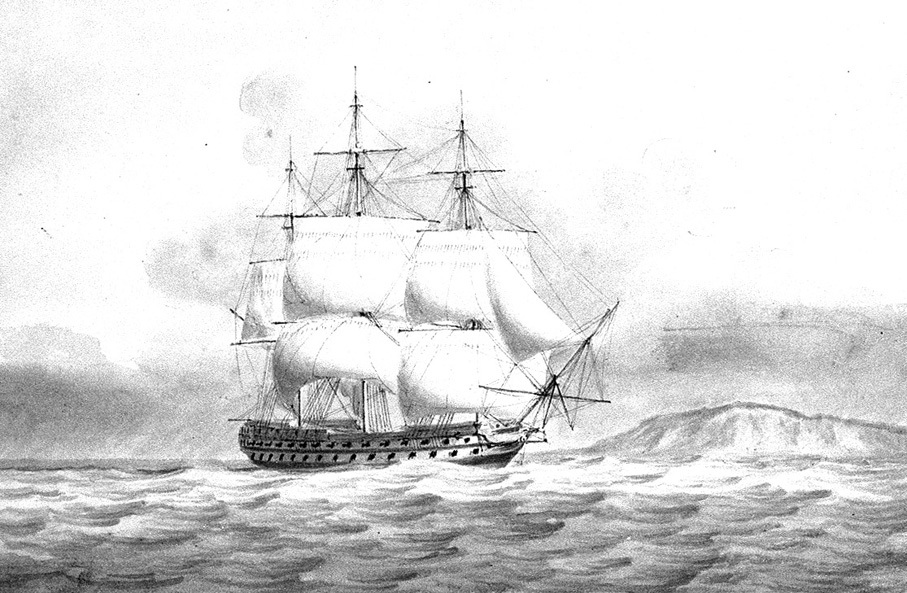
The Cumberland at sea

In October 1809, she took part in the Battle of Maguelone under Wodehouse.

On 12 March 1812, as the merchant ship Ramoncita was returning from Lima and Cadiz, the French privateer Amelia captured her. However, HMS Virago recaptured Ramoncita. The salvage money notice stated that Virago had been in company with HMS Venerable, Cumberland, Elizabeth, and Plantagenet.

Cumberland was converted to serve as a prison ship by Chatham Dockyard from October 1829 to March 1830. She was renamed Fortitude on 15 November 1833. The ship was converted into a coal hulk from September 1845 to August 1848. She was sold to H. Castle & Son for £2,020 in February 1870 to be broken up at Charlton.
