= HMS Invincible (1808) =

Ship of the line of the Royal Navy

History

United Kingdom
- Name: HMS Invincible
- Ordered: 25 June 1801
- Builder: Woolwich Dockyard
- Laid down: 1 January 1806
- Launched: 15 March 1808
- Fate: Broken up, 1861

General characteristics
- Class & type: Ganges-class ship of the line
- Tons burthen: 1673 62/94 (bm)
- Length: 169 ft 6 in (51.66 m) (gundeck)
- Beam: 47 ft 8.5 in (14.542 m)
- Depth of hold: 20 ft 3 in (6.17 m)
- Propulsion: Sails
- Sail plan: Full-rigged ship
- Armament: 74 guns: Gundeck: 28 × 32 pdrs; Upper gundeck: 28 × 18 pdrs; Quarterdeck: 14 × 9 pdrs; Forecastle: 4 × 9 pdrs

HMS Invincible was a 74-gun third rate ship of the line of the Royal Navy, launched on 15 March 1808 at Woolwich.

She was employed as a coal hulk from 1857, and was broken up in 1861.
