= HMS Windsor Castle (1790) =

Ship of the line of the Royal Navy

- Windsor Castle

History

Great Britain
- Name: HMS Windsor Castle
- Ordered: 10 December 1782
- Builder: Deptford Dockyard
- Laid down: 19 August 1784
- Launched: 3 May 1790
- Honours and awards: Participated in: Naval Battle of Genoa (1795); Battle of Cape Finisterre (1805)
- Fate: Broken up, 1839

General characteristics
- Class & type: London-class ship of the line
- Tons burthen: 1871 (bm)
- Length: 177 ft 6 in (54.10 m) (gundeck)
- Beam: 49 ft (15 m)
- Depth of hold: 21 ft (6.4 m)
- Propulsion: Sails
- Sail plan: Full-rigged ship
- Armament: 98 guns: Gundeck: 28 × 32-pounder guns; Middle gundeck: 30 × 18-pounder guns; Upper gundeck: 30 × 12-pounder guns; Quarterdeck: 8 × 12-pounder guns; Forecastle: 2 × 12-pounder guns

HMS Windsor Castle was a 98-gun second-rate ship of the line of the Royal Navy, launched on 3 May 1790 at Deptford Dockyard.

== Dardanelles ==
Windsor Castle was part of Robert Calder's fleet at the Battle of Cape Finisterre in 1805. She shared in the prize and head money for San Rafael and Firme captured on that day. (Note: A captain's share was worth £564 2s 4d; a seaman's share was worth £1 2s 4d.)

On 25 September a French squadron of five frigates and two corvettes under Commodore Eleonore-Jean-Nicolas Soleil was escorting a convoy ferrying supplies and troops to the French West Indies. A British squadron intercepted the convoy, which led to the action of 25 September 1806, where the British captured four of the frigates: Armeide, Minerva, Indefatigable, and Gloire. The frigate Thétis and the corvette Sylphe escaped, with Lynx managing to outrun Windsor Castle. (Note: A seaman's share of the prize money was worth £4 4s 4d.)

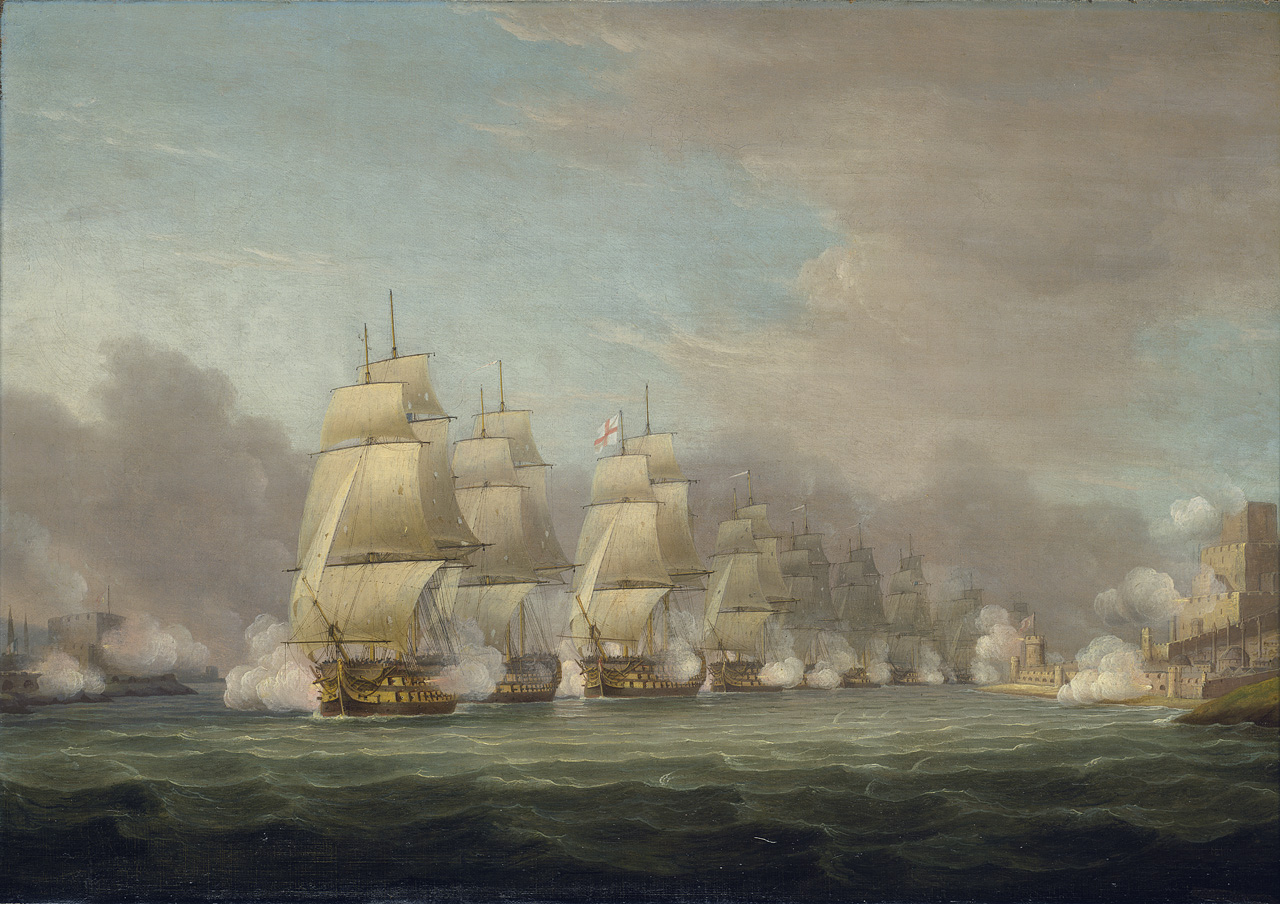
Duckworth's squadron forcing the Dardanelles

While in the Mediterranean she served during Vice Admiral Sir John Duckworth's unsuccessful 1807 Dardanelles Operation. On 19 February, Windsor Castle suffered seven men wounded while forcing the Dardanelles. Near a redoubt on Point Pesquies the British encountered a Turkish squadron of one ship of 64 guns, four frigates and eight other vessels, most of which they ran aground. Marines from Pompee spiked the 31 guns on the redoubt. On 27 February Windsor Castle had one man killed assisting a Royal Marine landing party on the island of Prota.

On the way out, the Turkish castle at Abydos fired on the British squadron. Granite cannonballs weighing 7-800 pounds and measuring 6'6" in circumference hit Windsor Castle, Standard and Active. Windsor Castle was badly damaged when an 800-pound stone shot from a Turkish cannon sheared off her main mast. Windsor Castle had four men killed and 20 wounded in the withdrawal. In all, the British lost 29 killed and 138 wounded. No ship was lost.

Windsor Castle accompanied Duckworth on the Alexandria expedition of 1807, and in May left Alexandria and sailed to Malta.

== Fate ==
She was reduced to a 74-gun ship in 1814, and was eventually broken up in 1839.
