= William Lukin =

Royal Navy officer

Vice-Admiral William Lukin
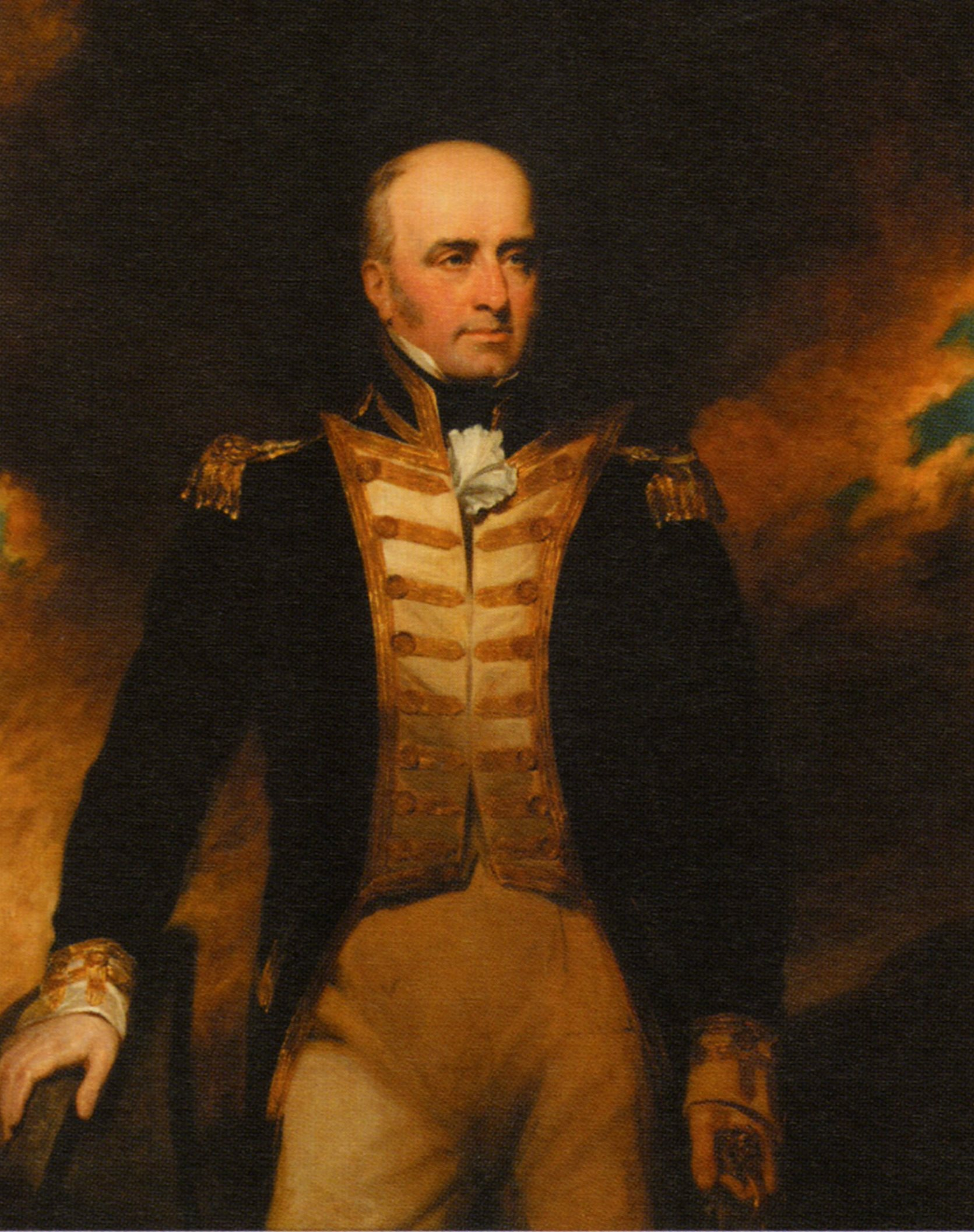
- Portrait of Vice Admiral Lukin by George Clint, c. 1825
- Born: William Lukin; 20 September 1768; Felbrigg, Norfolk
- Died: 12 January 1833 (aged 64); Felbrigg Hall, Felbrigg, Norfolk
- Relatives: William Windham (half-uncle); William Howe Windham (son); Charles Ash Windham (son)
- Military career
- Allegiance: Great Britain; United Kingdom
- Branch: Royal Navy
- Service years: c. 1781–1814
- Rank: Vice-Admiral
- Commands: HMS Hornet; HMS Thames; HMS Mars; HMS Chatham
- Conflicts: French Revolutionary Wars; Napoleonic Wars; Action of 25 September 1806; Battle of Copenhagen

Vice-Admiral William Lukin Windham (born William Lukin; 20 September 1768 – 12 January 1833) was a Royal Navy officer who rose to the rank of Vice Admiral and served with great distinction through the Napoleonic Wars. Eventually he inherited the house and estates of William Windham.

== Early life ==
William Lukin was born in the village of Felbrigg, Norfolk on 20 September 1768. He was the son of the Rev. George Lukin and Susan Katherine Doughty. His father was the rector of Felbrigg and Aylmerton. The Rev. George Lukin was the half brother of William Windham. who was the local squire of Felbrigg Hall and one time member of parliament for Norwich and Secretary at War in the Cabinet. Windham had a special affection for all the children of the Rev. Lukin and in particular William Lukin who would eventually become his heir. The young William Lukin went to sea probably around 1781 at the age of 13. He appears to have been a keen seaman and a fast learner and survived the harsh life in the navy, and by 1786 he had become a midshipman.

=== Promotion through the ranks ===
In 1793 Lukin had become a Lieutenant, and by 1795 he had been given command of HMS Hornet, a 16-gun sloop. Soon after this appointment he was given the rank of Captain and with this promotion he was given HMS Thames, a vessel of 32 guns, which had been re-captured on 8 June 1796 from the French who had initially captured the ship in 1793. As Britain faced war with France, Lukin's career began to rise steadily in the Royal Navy especially with a powerful patron like William Windham. Windham did all he could to assist Lukin's rapid advancement within the Navy through his great friendship with Lord George Spencer, who was the First Lord of the Admiralty.

=== Spithead mutiny ===
In April 1797 Captain William Lukin found himself embroiled in the Spithead mutiny. Sixteen ships of the line of the Channel fleet refused to sail and mounted a collective mutiny at Spithead. Their demands were concerned with improved pay and conditions, and better treatment in general. Some officers considered to ill-treat their crews were sent ashore and their permanent removal demanded. Lukin was recorded as performing well in quelling the discontent and as a result helped the mutiny at Spithead to be resolved in a peaceful and organised manner and within a few weeks the seamen's demands had been met and a Royal Pardon granted. It was noted Captain Lukin's vessel, HMS Thames was the first to be ready to resume its duties within the Royal Navy.

=== War between Britain and France ===
On 18 May 1803 Britain declared war with France and one response to these events was that the Secretary at War, Charles Yorke introduced a bill in Parliament to increase the armed forces by creating reserve army of 30,000 men. At the behest of William Windham, Lukin was given the task of establishing a local militia in North East Norfolk. This role he embraced with great gusto and was successful in the task.

== Back to sea ==
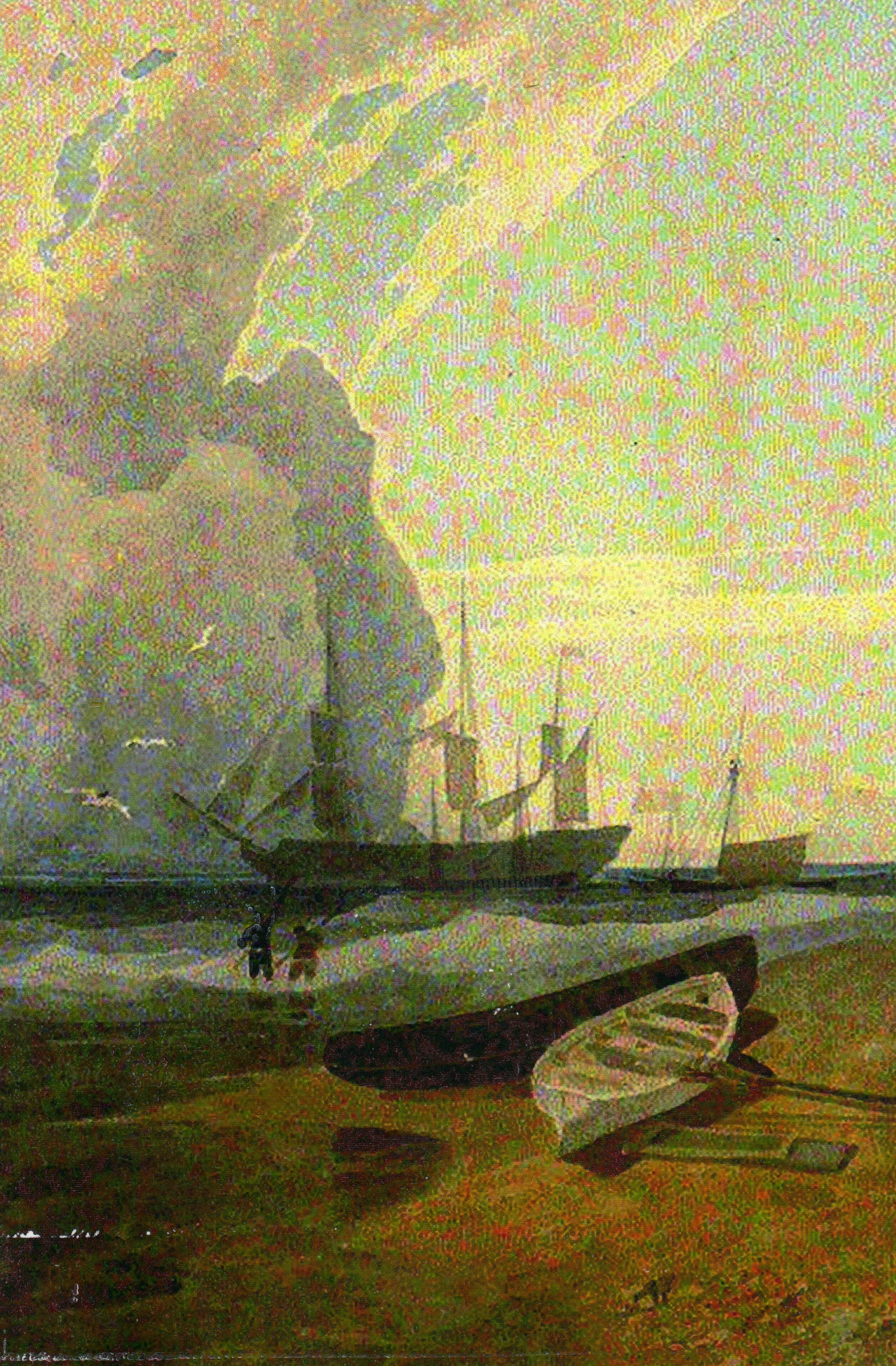
HMS Mars at anchor off the coast at Cromer, Norfolk

Now the war with France had started, William Lukin was given command of various warships with the most notable being the 74-gun third-rate ship of the line HMS Mars.

=== Rochefort, Bay of Biscay ===
Lukin took the Mars into Action of 25 September 1806 in the naval battle fought off the French Biscay port of Rochefort. A French convoy of five frigates and two corvettes, sailing to the French West Indies with supplies and reinforcements, under the command of Commodore Eleonore-Jean-Nicolas Soleil, was intercepted by a British squadron of six ships of the line that was keeping a close blockade of the port as part of the Atlantic campaign of 1806. The British ships, under the command of Commodore Sir Samuel Hood, spotted the French convoy early in the morning of 25 September, just a few hours after the French had left port, and immediately gave chase. Although the French ships tried to escape, they were heavily laden and the strong winds favoured the larger ships of the line, which caught the French convoy after a five-hour pursuit, although they had become separated from one another during the chase. Soleil had ordered his ships to split. One of the French ships, the Infatigable, a 40-gun Valeureuse class frigate, was heading north. Lukin took HMS Mars out of the British line and went in pursuit of Infatigable. Failing to outrun HMS Mars, Captain Lukin forced the Infatigable to surrender after a brief cannonade. Later in the action, Commodore Eleonore-Jean-Nicolas Soleil's flagship, the 44-gun frigate Gloire, which by now had sustained damaged, could not distance herself from the British flagship HMS Centaur sufficiently before support arrived in the form of HMS Mars. With his ship undamaged, Lukin was able to easily catch the fleeing frigate and opened fire at 14:30pm, combat continuing for half an hour before Soleil surrendered his badly damaged frigate. These deeds brought with them a considerable sum in prize money.

=== Bombardment of Copenhagen ===
HMS Mars and Captain Lukin participated in the bombardment, which took place between 16 August and 5 September known as the Second Battle of Copenhagen (or the Bombardment of Copenhagen), which was a British preemptive attack on Copenhagen, targeting the civilian population in order to seize the Dano-Norwegian fleet. This action was taken because there was concern in Britain that Napoleon might try to force Denmark to close the Baltic Sea to British ships, perhaps by marching French troops into Zealand. The British believed that access to the Baltic was "vitally important to Britain" for trade as well as a major source of necessary raw materials for building and maintaining warships, and that it gave the Royal Navy access to help Britain's allies, Sweden and (before Tilsit) Russia, against France. After the Danes rejected British demands to surrender, the British fleet under Admiral Gambier bombarded the city from 2 to 5 September 1807. Captain Lukin and HMS Mars which had joined the fleet on 8 August, participated in this bombardment which resulted in Danish General Peymann surrendering both the city and the fleet on 7 September 1807.

=== Final command ===
William Lukin's final command in the service of the Royal Navy was as captain of the 50-gun fourth rate ship of the line HMS Chatham. This new command brought to a close the naval career of Lukin. He had served his country with reliability and efficiency throughout the Napoleonic wars with one or two outstanding actions. Lukin effectively left the navy in 1814 with the rank of vice admiral of the blue, just a year away from the end of the war; he saw no further active service.

== Felbrigg Hall ==
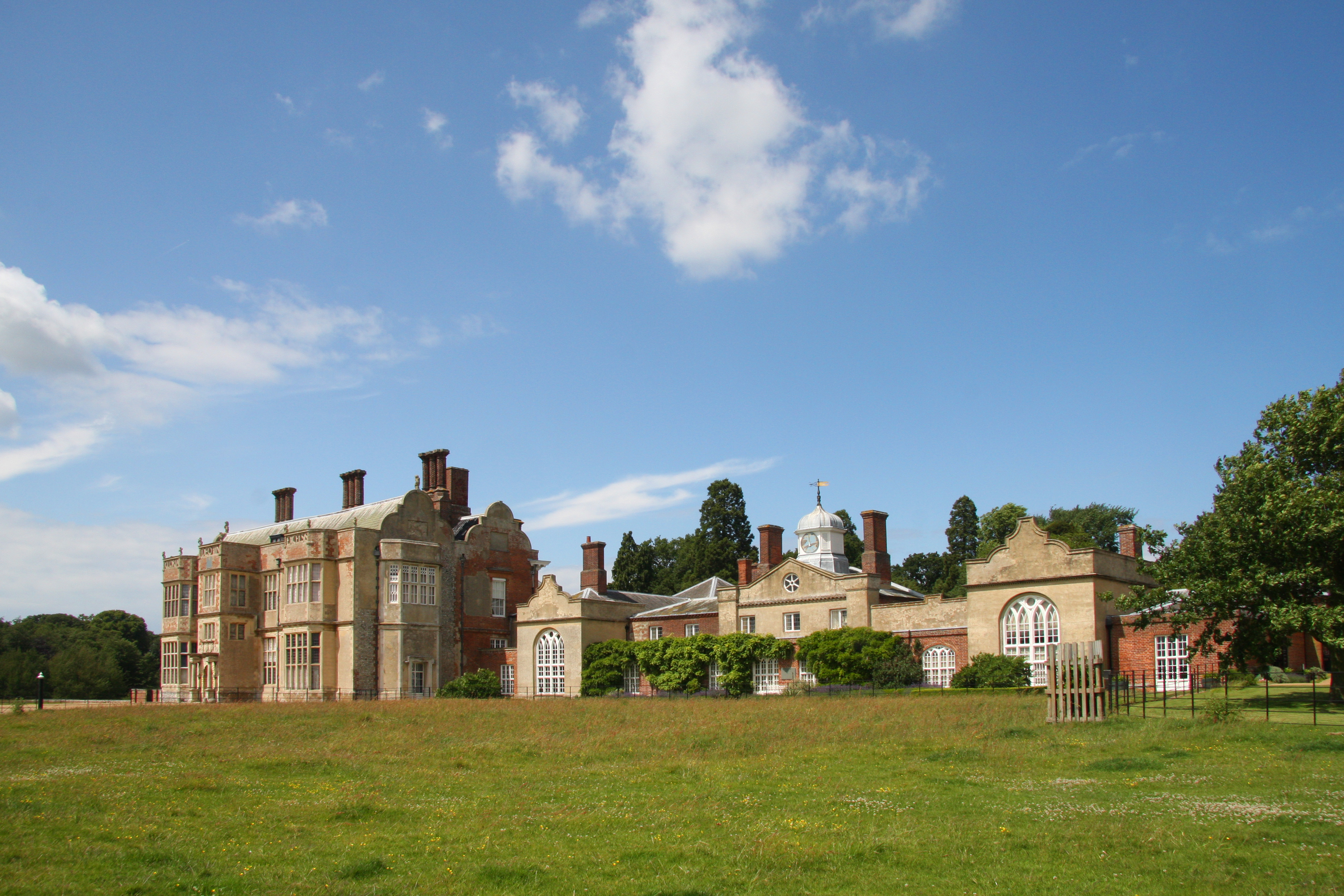
Felbrigg Hall

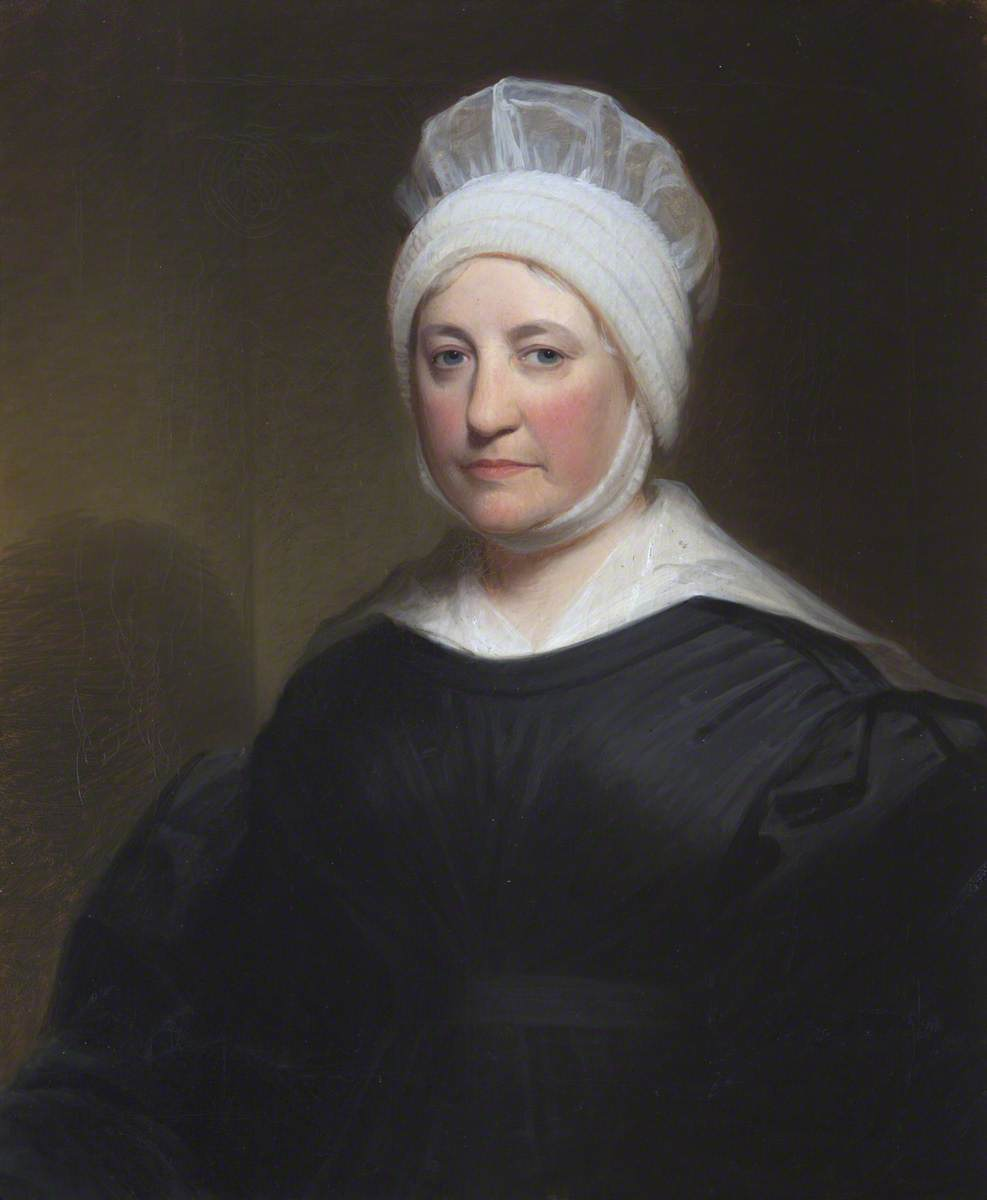
Portrait of his wife, Anne (née Thellusson), by William Edward West, 1833

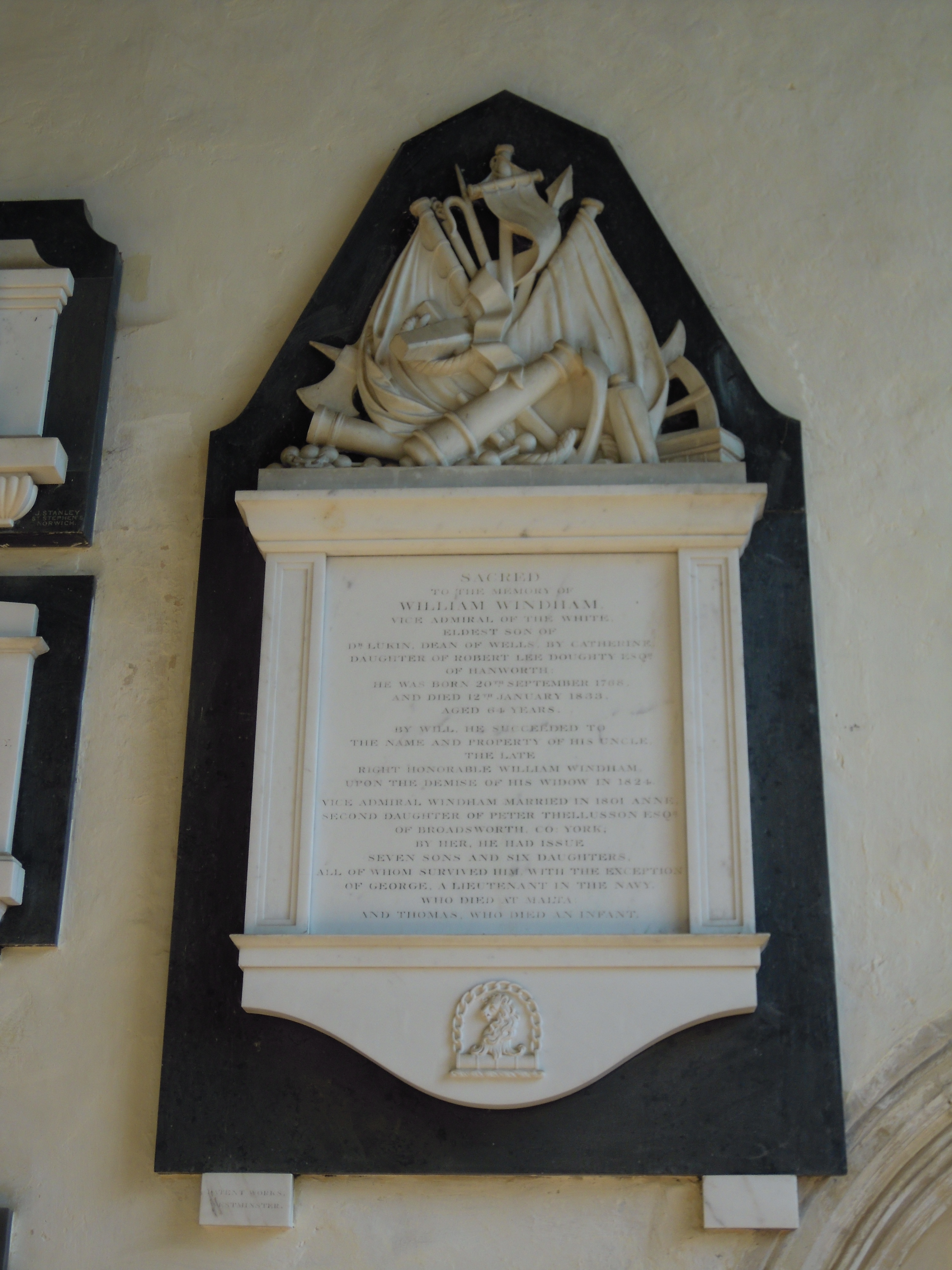
Vice Admiral Lukin's memorial plaque inside St Margaret's Church, Felbrigg

William Windham died on 4 June 1810, and was last of his line. His death effectively ended the hereditary succession of the Felbrigg estates which had run uninterrupted for 350 years. The Felbrigg estate was left to Windham's wife Cecilia Windham in the first instance for the remainder of her life. Thereafter, William Windham's heir was Vice Admiral William Lukin. Lukin was related to Windham as he was the grandson of William Windham's mother by her first marriage. After his retirement from the Navy, Lukin settled back to north Norfolk, to a small estate farm at Metton which was close to Felbrigg. Lukin and his wife Anne Thellusson (a daughter of Peter Thellusson and granddaughter of Isaac de Thellusson) settled into family life with their 12 children. With six sons and six daughters to raise the Lukins soon found finances were stretched and as a consequence in 1820 Lukin moved to Brussels with his family to save money.

On 5 May 1824, Cecilia Windham died and William Lukin inherited Felbrigg. At the same time he changed his name, assuming the name Windham along with the family coat of arms. The estate and house were finally woken from fourteen years of slumber. William Lukin Windham, as he was now called, employed architect W. J. Donthorne to remodel, extend, and alter the house and stable block. The Admiral remained at the Hall and led a quiet life until his death in 1833. Two of his sons William Howe Windham (the eldest) and Charles Ash Windham represented East Norfolk in Parliament; the latter fought in the Crimean War and rose to the rank of General. A third son Cdr. John Henry Windham RN, followed him into the Navy.
