= Atlantic campaign =

The Atlantic campaign might refer to:

- The Atlantic campaign of May 1794 fought between Britain and France as part of the French Revolutionary Wars
- The Atlantic campaign of 1806 fought between Britain and France as part of the Napoleonic Wars
- The Atlantic U-boat campaign of World War I
- The Battle of the Atlantic in the Second World War
