= French frigate Valeureuse =

History

France
- Name: Valeureuse
- Builder: Charles-Henri Tellier, Le Havre
- Laid down: 19 July 1797
- Launched: 13 August 1798
- Commissioned: 25 June 1801
- Fate: Sold, 31 August 1806

General characteristics
- Class & type: Seine-class frigate
- Displacement: 1341 tonneaux
- Tons burthen: 712-759 port tonneaux
- Length: Overall:147 ft 0 in (44.8 m); Keel:137 ft 0 in (41.8 m)
- Beam: 37 ft 2 in (11.3 m)
- Draught: Unladen:15 ft 9 in (4.8 m); Laden:16 ft 11 in (5.2 m)
- Depth of hold: 18 ft 0 in (5.5 m)
- Complement: Peacetime:260; War service:340
- Armament: Upper deck:28 × 18-pounder guns; Spar deck:12 × 8-pounder long guns + 4 × 36-pounder obusiers de vaisseau

Valeureuse was a 40-gun Valeureuse-class (modified Seine-class frigate) frigate of the French Navy, launched in 1798 and so damaged in a storm in 1806 that she was sold for breaking up.

== Career ==
Valeureuse took part in the Atlantic campaign of 1806 in Willaumez's squadron. The French squadron left Brest on 14 December 1805. On 9 March 1806 the squadron was at 15°22′S 13°25′W, some 150 leagues west of Saint Helena.

On the cruise Valeureuse visited São Salvador, Guyane, and Fort-de-France.

On 14 August 1806 Valeureuse captured and sank the merchantman Hebe, Teuton, master, which had been sailing from Trinidad to Bermuda.

== Fate ==
In August 1806, a storm caused Valeureuse to separate from the fleet. She took refuge on 31 August in Delaware Bay, where she arrived dismasted. Valeureuse was in such a bad state that she had to be sold.

On 24 October Lloyd's List reported that Valeureuse had gone into Philadelphia. She was condemned at Philadelphia, and was sold at Marcus Hook, Pennsylvania.

Her officers and crew, and stores were put aboard the American ship George Washington. On 15 January 1807 HMS Blanche intercepted George Washington off Bordeaux. The British found that she was carrying Captain Kargarian (Kergariou), the former commander of Valeureuse, and 306 of his officers and men, but no stores from Valeureuse. The British took the Frenchmen aboard Blanche as prisoners and then sent George Washington to England. George Washington arrived at Portsmouth on 2 February.
