= Atlantic campaign of 1806 =

1806 campaign of the Napoleonic Wars

- Part of the Napoleonic Wars
- The Battle of San Domingo, a major battle of the campaign
Date	December 1805 – September 1806
Location	Atlantic Ocean and Caribbean Sea
Result	British victory

Belligerents
United Kingdom	France

Commanders and leaders
John Duckworth; Richard Strachan; John Borlase Warren	Jean-Baptiste Willaumez; Corentin Leissègues

The Atlantic campaign of 1806 was a series of manoeuvres and counter-manoeuvres conducted by squadrons of the French Navy and the British Royal Navy across the Atlantic Ocean during the spring and summer of 1806, as part of the Napoleonic Wars. The campaign followed directly from the Trafalgar campaign of the year before, in which the French Mediterranean fleet had crossed the Atlantic, returned to Europe and joined with the Spanish fleet. On 21 October 1805, this combined force was destroyed by a British fleet under Lord Nelson at the Battle of Trafalgar, although the campaign did not end until the Battle of Cape Ortegal on 4 November 1805. Believing that the French Navy would not be capable of organised resistance at sea during the winter, the First Lord of the Admiralty Lord Barham withdrew the British blockade squadrons to harbour. Barham had miscalculated – the French Atlantic fleet, based at Brest, had not been involved in the Trafalgar campaign and was therefore at full strength. Taking advantage of the reduction in the British forces off the port, Napoleon ordered two heavy squadrons to sea, under instructions to raid British trade routes while avoiding contact with equivalent Royal Navy forces.

Departing from Brest on 13 December 1805, it was 12 days before the British Admiralty were aware of the French movements, by which time the French squadrons were deep in the Atlantic, one under Vice-admiral Corentin Urbain de Leissègues intending to cruise in the Caribbean and the other, under Counter-admiral Jean-Baptiste Philibert Willaumez, sailing for the South Atlantic. Two British squadrons were hastily mustered and dispatched in pursuit, one under the command of Rear-admiral Sir Richard Strachan and the other under Rear-admiral Sir John Borlase Warren. These squadrons were joined by a third under Rear-admiral Sir John Thomas Duckworth, who had deserted his station off Cádiz when he learned news of a French squadron to his south and subsequently crossed the Atlantic in pursuit of Willaumez. Although Willaumez managed to escape into the South Atlantic, Leissègues was less successful and was discovered and destroyed at the Battle of San Domingo in February 1806 by a combined force under Duckworth and Rear-admiral Alexander Cochrane. Other squadrons already at sea became embroiled in the campaign: a smaller squadron that had been raiding the African coast under Commodore Jean-Marthe-Adrien l'Hermite since August 1805 provided a diversion to the major campaign but failed to draw off significant British forces, while the remnants of a French squadron under Counter-admiral Charles-Alexandre Léon Durand Linois that had been operating in the Indian Ocean since 1803 was intercepted and defeated by Warren in March, after a chance encounter on its journey back to France.

Willaumez achieved minor success in his operations in the South Atlantic and Caribbean, but was caught in a summer hurricane on his return journey and his ships were scattered along the Eastern Seaboard of North America. One was intercepted and destroyed by British forces and others were so badly damaged in the storm that they were forced to shelter in American ports. The survivors gradually returned to Brest during the autumn, the last arriving in early 1807. The campaign was the last significant operation in the Atlantic for the remainder of the war, and no French squadron of any size left any of the Biscay ports until 1808. The losses suffered by the Brest fleet weakened it so severely that it would not participate in a major operation until 1809, when an attempt to break out of Brest ended in defeat at the Battle of Basque Roads.

== Background ==
=== Trafalgar ===
On 30 March 1805, the French Mediterranean Fleet under Vice-admiral Pierre-Charles Villeneuve successfully broke out of Toulon harbour, avoiding the British blockade fleet under Vice-admiral Lord Nelson and sailing westwards out of the Mediterranean and into the Atlantic, Nelson following several days behind. Villeneuve, joined by a Spanish squadron, crossed the ocean to the Caribbean and anchored at Martinique, while Nelson arrived at Barbados on 11 June. Panicked by the British arrival, Villeneuve immediately returned to Europe, with Nelson again close behind. Villeneuve's orders had specified that he sail to Brest, the French naval port on the Bay of Biscay, and join there with the fleet under Vice-admiral Honoré Ganteaume. Together this force would drive the Royal Navy out of the English Channel in preparation for an invasion of Britain. However, as he passed the Spanish port of Ferrol on 22 July 1805, Villeneuve was intercepted by a British fleet under Vice-admiral Sir Robert Calder. At the ensuing Battle of Cape Finisterre, Calder captured two Spanish ships but failed to inflict a decisive blow on Villeneuve's squadron, which later sailed to Cádiz, Spain's principal Atlantic seaport. Nelson arrived shortly afterwards and initiated a blockade of the port.

On 21 October 1805, Villeneuve's combined Franco-Spanish fleet sailed from Cádiz and was intercepted by Nelson, resulting in the Battle of Trafalgar. Although Nelson was killed at the height of the battle, his squadron inflicted a devastating defeat on the combined fleet, capturing or destroying 17 French or Spanish ships, including Villeneuve's flagship. The battered remnants of the French Mediterranean and Spanish Atlantic fleets retreated to Cádiz, although four French ships fled north and were intercepted and captured at the Battle of Cape Ortegal two weeks later. In total, the campaign cost Napoleon 13 French and 12 Spanish ships, eliminating any possibility of even regional superiority at sea and therefore preventing the planned invasion of Britain, which had already been indefinitely postponed. The elimination of the French and Spanish fleets and the end of the threat of French invasion was widely celebrated in Britain, and seen by First Lord of the Admiralty Lord Barham, as an opportunity to reduce costs and damage to his ships by withdrawing the Atlantic blockade to Britain during the winter under the assumption that the battered French Navy would be unable and unwilling to operate at sea during the period. He wrote: "It is of little purpose now, to wear out our ships in a fruitless blockade during the winter."

=== French plans ===
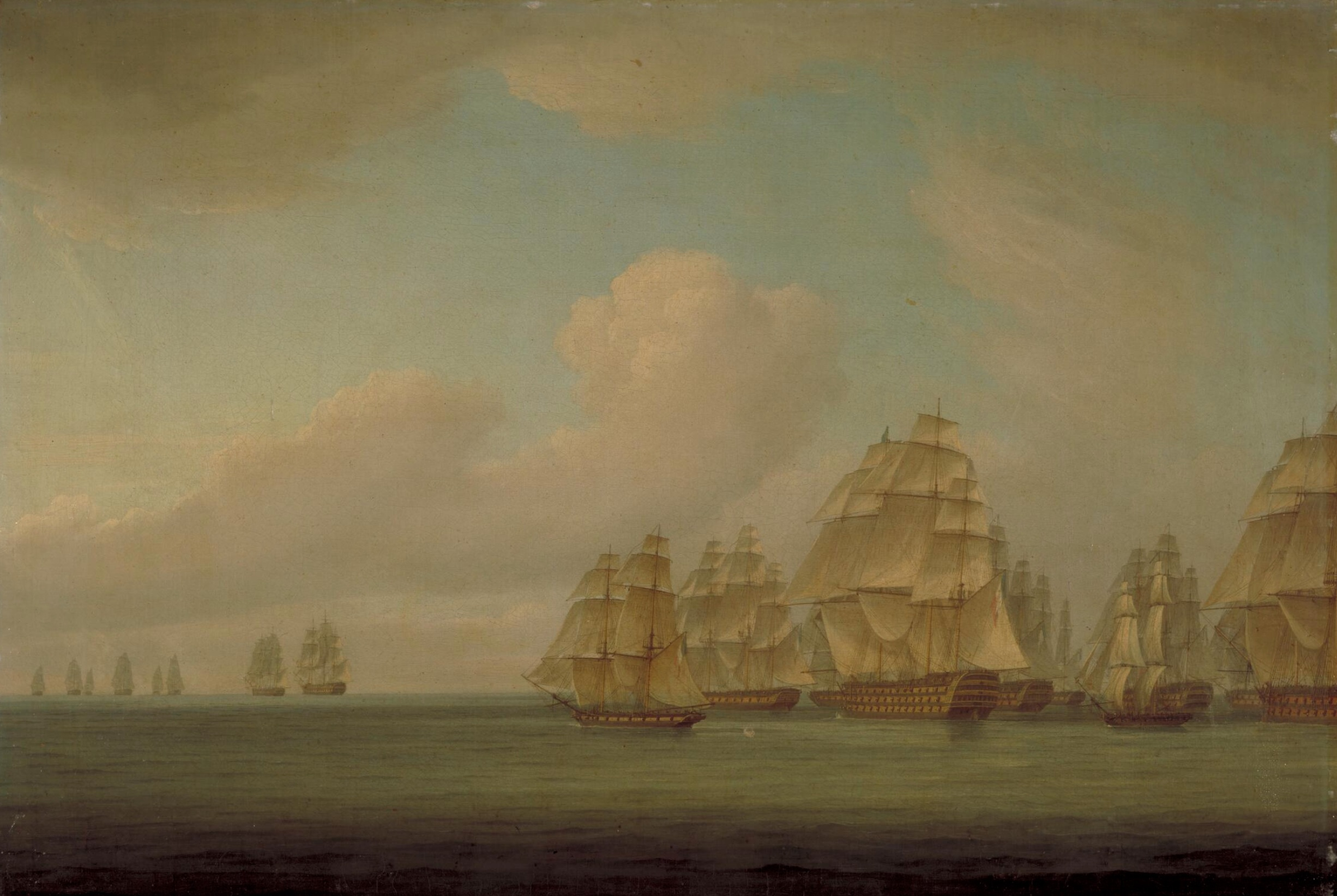
Zacharie Allemand's squadron pursuing a British convoy on 25 September 1805

Barham had seriously miscalculated the strength of the Brest fleet, which had been uninvolved in the campaign of 1805 and was therefore at full strength. He also underestimated Napoleon, who had observed that Villeneuve's brief stay in the Caribbean had acted as a major threat to British trade, delaying convoys and causing panic among the West Indian merchants. The French naval authorities were also inspired by the effect of a raiding squadron under Counter-admiral Zacharie Allemand, which had escaped from Rochefort on 17 July 1805, caused significant disruption to British trade in the Atlantic and remained at sea off the North African coast. Seeking to repeat these effects, in November 1805 Napoleon ordered the commander at Brest, Vice-admiral Honoré Joseph Antoine Ganteaume, to prepare two strong squadrons for service in the Atlantic. These were to leave Brest under cover of darkness on 13 December, sail deep into the Atlantic and intercept any merchant convoys that they encountered. Subsequently, the squadrons were to separate, with one going to the South Atlantic and the other to the Caribbean to cause as much disruption to British intercontinental trade as possible. The orders encouraged the squadron's commanders not to engage any Royal Navy force of equivalent size or larger to avoid the risk of being captured or destroyed.

Ganteaume selected 11 ships of the line for the operation, including the 120-gun Impérial. Chosen as Leissègues' flagship, Impérial was to sail for the Caribbean with four other ships of the line, two frigates and a corvette. Leissègues' squadron carried over 1,000 French soldiers to augment the garrison on Santo Domingo under General Jean-Louis Ferrand, and was then required to spend two months blockading Jamaica before cruising along the American Eastern Seaboard to Newfoundland, returning to France when food supplies ran low. The other squadron was given to Counter-admiral Jean-Baptiste Philibert Willaumez in Foudroyant, with orders to cruise the shipping lanes of the South Atlantic before sailing to the Leeward Islands, communicating with the French colonies of Martinique, Guadeloupe and Cayenne and blockading Barbados. When British opposition became too strong, he was to return to the South Atlantic off Saint Helena, also returning to France once food supplies ran low. His squadron consisted of six ships of the line, two frigates and two brigs, and included among its captains Jérôme Bonaparte, the Emperor's younger brother. Although both squadrons carried six months provisions, they were expected to capture more during their voyages and it was intended that their raiding operations should last as long as 14 months, causing severe indirect damage to the British economy by restricting the movement of trade.

== December 1805 ==
On 13 December 1805, with the majority of the British blockade squadron anchored in Cawsand Bay and the remainder driven far offshore by a winter gale, the French squadrons sailed from Brest into the Bay of Biscay unnoticed. Within two days they had passed nearly 500 nautical miles (930 km) into the Atlantic Ocean and had encountered a British merchant convoy, Willaumez detaching in pursuit. The convoy was sailing to Britain from Gibraltar, escorted by the 64-gun HMS Polyphemus under Captain Robert Redmill and the frigate HMS Sirius under Captain William Prowse. Heavily outnumbered, the convoy turned away and ran before the wind, Willaumez in close pursuit. Later in the day a second convoy appeared to the north, of 23 ships sailing from Cork to the Caribbean escorted by the frigates HMS Arethusa under Captain Charles Brisbane, HMS Boadicea under Captain John Maitland and the brig HMS Wasp. With Willaumez distracted, Leissègues ordered his squadron in pursuit.

Willaumez's ships captured a number of stragglers from Redmill's convoy and managed to isolate Sirius, which only just escaped after narrowly avoiding an unequal encounter with four French ships of the line. With the convoy dispersed, Willaumez gathered his scattered forces and despatched the frigate Volontaire to the Spanish island of Tenerife with the prizes, before turning the remainder of his squadron southwards for his designated cruising grounds. To the north, Leissègues gradually approached Brisbane's convoy during the night but did not close with him until the morning of 16 December. In response, Brisbane formed his three warships into a line of battle, accompanied by three of the larger merchant ships. This force could not hope to resist Leissègues' main force, but would enable the 17 other vessels to escape by blocking the French squadron's frigates from chasing them. Ignoring the escaping convoy, Leissègues formed his own line of battle and continued to close with Brisbane, whose faster ships steadily pulled away from the French throughout the day. As darkness fell, Leissègues abandoned the pursuit and turned to the south and Brisbane immediately despatched Boadicea to Brest and Wasp to the blockade squadrons along the Atlantic Seaboard with urgent warnings of the French operations in the Eastern Atlantic. Brisbane himself remained in distant contact with Leissègues for another day before the French squadron sheered away. Brisbane continued southwards with the remainder of his convoy, seeking the British blockade squadron at Cádiz.

=== Duckworth's cruise ===
On 20 November 1805, Allemand's squadron encountered a British convoy off the Savage Islands. Allemand's squadron was on its return journey to France when he encountered the convoy, consisting of six merchant ships sailing from Britain to Gorée under the escort of the brig HMS Lark under Commander Frederick Langford. Langford gave orders for his convoy to scatter as the French approached, Lark turning northwards in search of Rear-admiral Sir John Thomas Duckworth and the Cádiz squadron, reaching it on 26 November. Duckworth immediately sailed in pursuit of Allemand, leaving behind only two frigates to watch Cádiz in his absence.

Sailing south from Cádiz, Duckworth's squadron reached Madeira on 5 December, passing Tenerife ten days later without sighting any French ships. Continuing south to the Cape Verde Islands, Duckworth reluctantly conceded that the French squadron had escaped and he retired northwards until he encountered Brisbane's reduced convoy on 23 December. Tracking the presumed course of Leissègues' ships, Duckworth continued northwards on a course that would intercept the French squadron. At 06:45 on 25 December, at 30°52′N 20°16′W, approximately 200 nautical miles (370 km) northwest of the Canary Islands, lookouts in Duckworth's squadron spotted nine sails in the distance. As Allemand's squadron was estimated to have approximately nine ships, Duckworth initially believed that his enemy was Allemand, possibly accompanied by prizes captured on his cruise. However, as he closed with the French, it became clear that this was a different squadron altogether. In fact his target was Willaumez, and despite the French admiral's efforts, Duckworth was steadily gaining on him, the ships of the line HMS Superb, HMS Spencer and HMS Agamemnon outstripping the rest of the British squadron.

By 13:00 on 26 December, the flagship Superb was just 7 nautical miles (13 km) behind the rearmost French ship, with Spencer 4 nautical miles (7.4 km) further back and Agamemnon another 5 nautical miles (9.3 km) distant. The rest of the squadron was more than 22 nautical miles (41 km) behind the leaders, almost completely out of sight, with the rearmost ship, HMS Donegal, more than 45 nautical miles (83 km) behind Superb. The more compact French squadron was therefore at an advantage. The British were too dispersed to be able to bring a powerful enough force to engage the French in equal battle and the distance between the individual British ships was too great to allow them to provide mutual support if Willaumez turned to face them. Therefore, to the fury of his officers, Duckworth called off the pursuit. This decision was heavily criticised, both at the time and subsequently: historian William James commenting that "had the Superb brought to action, as in the course of a few hours she might, the sternmost French ship . . . the issue, in all reasonable calculation, would have been favourable to the British". Captain of the flag ship, HMS Superb, Richard Goodwin Keats, having missed Trafalgar where he was to have been Nelson's second was keen for an engagement but makes no criticism of the decision when writing to Nelson's brother just a few days after the event.

Gathering his scattered squadron, Duckworth despatched the frigate HMS Amethyst to Britain with the news of the French activity in the Eastern Atlantic, his message suggesting that the French were probably destined for the Dutch East Indies. He himself turned southwest towards the Leeward Islands, where he could resupply his ships in preparation for resuming the blockade at Cádiz. On 2 January 1806 he ordered HMS Powerful under Captain Robert Plampin to sail for the Indian Ocean and reinforce the British squadron there, in case Willaumez's squadron reached Asian waters.

=== British response ===
Word of the French break-out did not reach Britain until 24 December, when a cartel arrived from Gibraltar with the news. The report understated the size of the French forces, claiming seven rather than eleven ships of the line had broken out, with four frigates. Recognising his error in withdrawing the blockade, Barham immediately ordered two squadrons to prepare for sea: one under Vice-admiral Sir John Borlase Warren gathered at Spithead, including the second rate HMS London and six other ships of the line. The other formed in Cawsand Bay under Strachan and consisted of the second rate HMS St George and five other ships of the line. Both were ordered to cruise the mid-Atlantic in search of the missing French squadrons, Warren in the vicinity of Madeira and subsequently the West Indies, eventually joining with the squadrons there under Rear-admiral Alexander Cochrane and Vice-admiral James Richard Dacres. Strachan was to pass Saint Helena and cruise the West African coast to the Cape of Good Hope, guarding the vital trade route in the Eastern Atlantic that connected Britain with India. If he was unable to discover the French he was instructed to attach his squadron to that under Commodore Home Riggs Popham that had been sent to captured the Dutch Cape Colony from the Batavian Republic in the autumn of 1805.

== Battle of San Domingo ==
On 12 January 1806, Duckworth's squadron anchored in Carlisle Bay, Barbados, sending HMS Acasta to St. Kitts for additional water supplies. On 19 January the whole squadron sailed to Basseterre at St. Kitts, where they anchored and took on fresh food and water. On 21 January two ships of the West Indian squadron joined them: HMS Northumberland under Captain John Morrison and HMS Atlas under Captain Samuel Pym. Northumberland was the flagship of Rear-admiral Alexander Cochrane, who met with Duckworth but had no new information about French movements in the region. In fact, Leissègues had arrived in the Caribbean on 20 January, his passage delayed since departing from Brisbane's convoy in December and his ships damaged and dispersed by a series of winter storms off the Azores. Disembarking the troops at Santo Domingo, Leissègues made repairs to his ships, awaited the arrival of the missing Alexandre and Brave, and took on supplies over the next two weeks in preparation for raiding operations in the West Indies.

On 1 February, the British sloop HMS Kingfisher arrived at St. Kitts with news that three French ships of the line had been spotted off Santo Domingo. Duckworth immediately weighted anchor and sailed for the port, passing St. Thomas on 3 February and through the Mona Passage the following day. On 5 February, the frigate HMS Magicienne under Captain Adam Mackenzie joined the squadron, accompanied by a captured Danish schooner that had recently departed Santo Domingo and whose crew were able to give a precise account of the French squadron at anchor in the harbour. Before the Danish ship had left port, a number of French officers had been concerned that the schooner might reveal details of their presence to the British and had demanded that Leissègues seize and burn the vessel, but the admiral had refused.

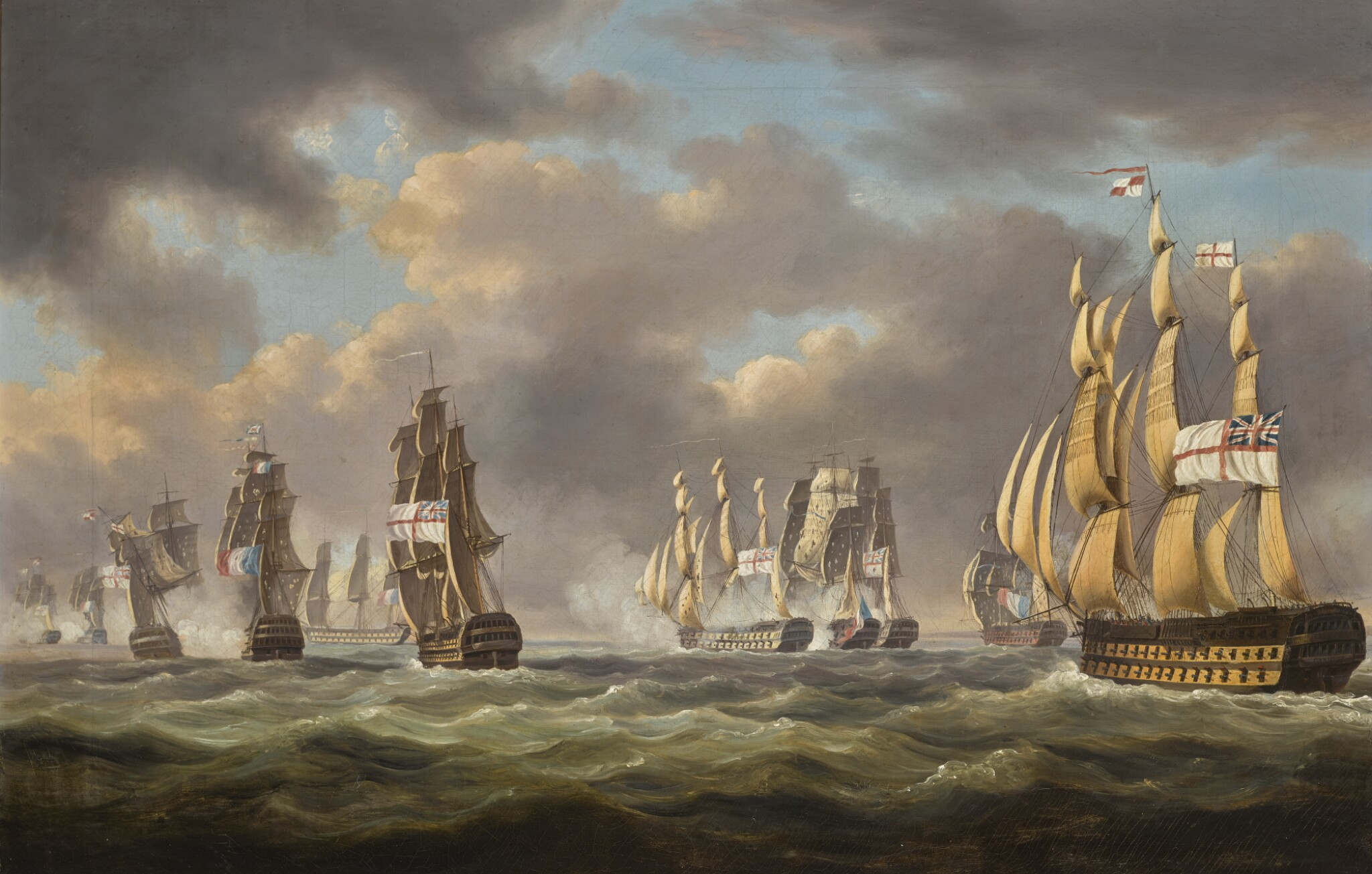
Painting of the battle by Robert Dodd

In the early morning of 6 February 1806, Duckworth's scouting frigates sighted Leissègues' squadron off the port of Santo Domingo. French lookouts reported the British squadron to Leissègues, who ordered his ships to sail in a line of battle westwards along the coast, in the direction of Nizao. As the chase began Richard Goodwin Keats, Captain of the Superb silently suspended a portrait of Nelson from the mizzen stay before addressing the men in a manner intended to encourage enthusiasm in the coming battle. A few minutes later the battle began, the band playing "God Save the King" and 'Nelson of the Nile' as Superb closed with Leissègues' leading ship followed by Cochrane in Northumberland and Spencer. The rest of the ships formed a second division led by Rear-admiral Thomas Louis in HMS Canopus, which rapidly fell behind the leading division. At 10:10, having made up all ground Superb opened fire on Alexandre, while Northumberland and Spencer engaged the next two French ships in line, Leissègues' flagship Impérial and Diomède. Within 15 minutes, Alexandre had fallen out of the line, dragging Spencer with her to the south, while Northumberland had suffered severe damage from Impérial's heavy gun batteries. At 10:35, Louis' squadron arrived, each ship raking Alexandre as they passed and leaving her dismasted and shattered. Canopus then passed on towards the melee surrounding Impérial while HMS Donegal targeted Brave and HMS Atlas attacked Jupiter, both of which rapidly surrendered, followed shortly afterwards by Alexandre.

With the French rear defeated, the remaining British ships focused their attack on Impérial and Diomède, but the intense smoke blocked the British view and caused Atlas to collide with Canopus, while fire from Impérial disabled Northumberland. At 11:30, surrounded by enemies and with escape impossible, Leissègues' decided to drive his remaining ships on shore rather than surrender. Steering for the beach and closely pursued by Canopus, both Impérial and Diomède were deliberately grounded. With the enemy line destroyed, Duckworth anchored offshore to observe French activity on the grounded ships and conduct hasty repairs. Out of range of British fire, small boats evacuated most of the remaining sailors from Impérial and Diomède, which had lost all their masts and were rapidly filling with water. When Duckworth sent in his frigates on 8 February it was clear that both ships were beyond repair, the British boarding parties removing the remaining 156 crew as prisoners and setting fire to the hulls. British casualties in the engagement had been 74 killed and 264 wounded, while the French total was estimated at 1,510, although accurate counts were not taken in the aftermath of the battle.

With his enemy defeated, Duckworth detached Northumberland and HMS Agamemnon to Barbados and took the rest of the squadron to Jamaica with the prizes. There he was acclaimed, and his victory was also celebrated in Britain when the news reached Europe in the brig HMS Kingfisher. Awards were distributed among the officers of the squadron but Duckworth was overlooked: his abandonment of Cádiz and the failure to bring Willaumez to battle in December had earned the enmity of Lord Collingwood, commander in chief of the Mediterranean Fleet, who blocked any awards to his subordinate. Historians William James and William Laird Clowes have both suggested that if Duckworth had not been victorious at San Domingo then he would probably have faced a court martial.

== Willaumez's cruise ==
=== South Atlantic ===
After outrunning Duckworth on 26 December, Willaumez sailed for the South Atlantic, intending to pass into the Indian Ocean and cruise off the Cape of Good Hope in anticipation of the arrival of the British China Fleet. The China Fleet was a large annual convoy of East Indiamen that originated in Canton and passed through the Malacca Straits, across the Indian Ocean, around the Cape of Good Hope and then north through the Atlantic Ocean, arriving in British waters six to eight months after departure. During the passage, the convoy gathered ships from the various British colonies in the Indian Ocean and by the time it passed the southern tip of Africa it often contained dozens of vessels. By combining the heavy armaments of the East Indiamen with a strong Royal Navy escort, the China Fleet became a formidable target for French raiding squadrons: at the Battle of Pulo Aura in February 1804, an unescorted China Fleet drove off a powerful French squadron under Counter-admiral Charles-Alexandre Léon Durand Linois after a sharp encounter.

Willaumez had planned to resupply his squadron at the Cape itself before searching for the China Fleet, but the crew of a merchant ship captured in the South Atlantic informed him that the Dutch Cape Colony had surrendered on 10 January 1806 to an expeditionary force under General Sir David Baird and Popham after five days of fighting. Turning away from the Cape, Willaumez decided to continue operations in the South Atlantic until April, when he put into Salvador in Brazil for supplies. Willaumez was fortunate to have collected this information before attempting to anchor in Table Bay: Popham had ordered all ships and shore facilities to continue to fly the Batavian flag in the hope that enemy ships would be lured within range of the port's gun batteries. On 4 March this ruse worked successfully when the frigate Volontaire, detached from Willaumez's squadron in December, anchored in the midst of Popham's squadron without realising their identity. Hopelessly outnumbered, Captain Bretel had no choice but to surrender, the British boarding party discovering 217 British troops in the hold, captured by Willaumez from Redmill's convoy.

=== Destruction of Linois ===
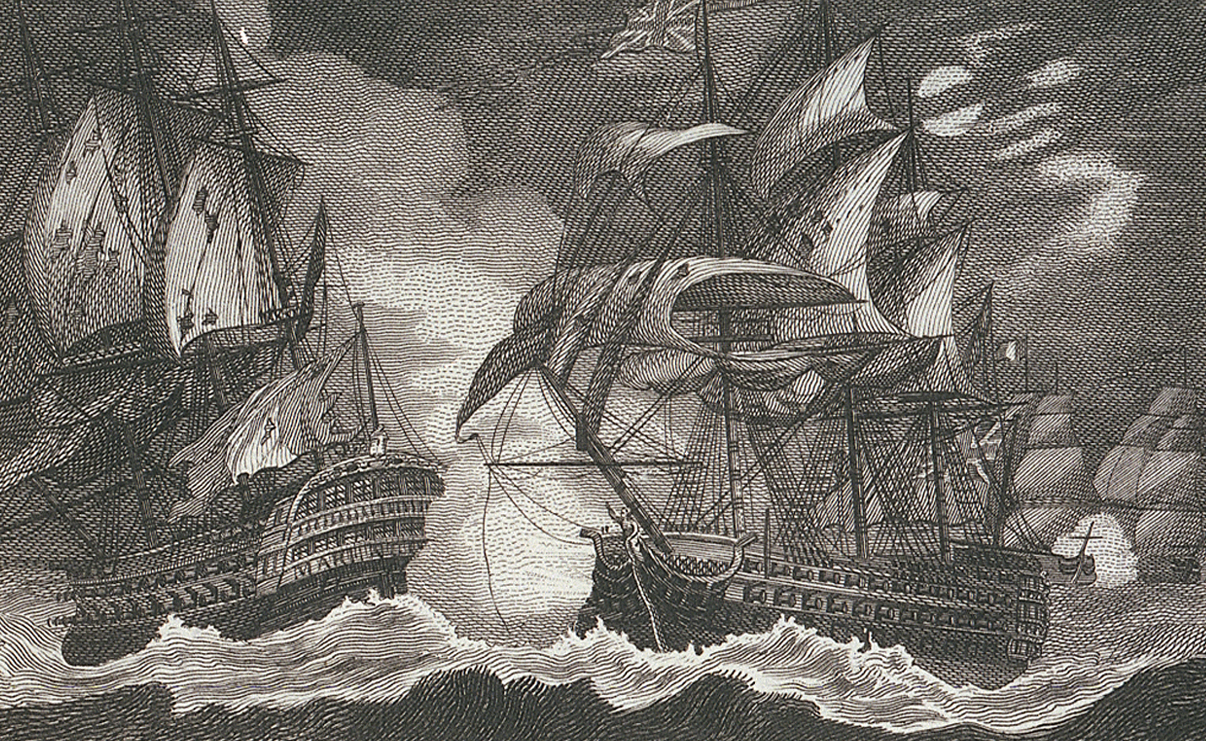
Contemporary engraving of the action of 13 March 1806

While Willaumez operated in the South Atlantic, Strachan and Warren's squadrons searched for his squadron hundreds of miles to the north. Warren's squadron cruised the eastern Atlantic, monitoring the trade routes than ran along the coast of West Africa while Strachan focused on the western Atlantic, particularly the southern approaches to the Caribbean. Although neither was in a position to intercept Willaumez until he began the return journey north, Warren's position afforded him the opportunity to watch for any French or allied vessels returning to Europe from the East. At 03:00 on 16 March 1806, lookouts on HMS London reported sails to the northeast and Captain Sir Harry Burrard-Neale ordered his ship in pursuit. Although no other ships in the squadron could see anything, Warren gave the order to follow London in case the sails proved to be French.

The distant ships were in fact the remains of Linois's squadron, which had put to sea on 13 March 1803 and operated in the Indian Ocean ever since. There Linois conducted a string of commerce raids that achieved minimal success, hampered by both the lack of naval stores at Île de France and Linois's hesitation in the face of the enemy. The squadron had missed opportunities at Pulo Aura and the Battle of Vizagapatam in 1804 and against a conovy escorted by Sir Thomas Troubridge in 1805. Much reduced by detachments and shipwreck, Linois's squadron now consisted only of his ship of the line Marengo and the frigate Belle Poule. At 03:00 on 13 March, lookouts on Marengo sighted sails to the southwest and despite his officers' misgivings Linois ordered Marengo to investigate, in the hope that he had discovered another merchant convoy.

At 05:30, London and Marengo almost collided in the darkness, Linois recognising the strange ship as a Royal Navy second rate and desperately turning away in an effort to escape. Marengo was too slow and Neale opened fire, rapidly inflicting serious damage to the French flagship. Captain Bruilhac on Belle Poule assisted his admiral for as long as possible, but at 06:15 swung away with British frigate HMS Amazon pursuing closely. The fighting continued for another four and a half hours, Linois defending his ship against mounting odds as the rest of Warren's squadron came into range. To the northeast, Amazon succeeded in catching Belle Poule, the British frigate inflicting serious damage on the French ship as she closed. Unable to escape or continue the fight, both Linois and Bruilhac surrendered at 11:00, although by that time the French admiral had been severely wounded and taken below. French losses were 69 killed and 106 wounded, while the British had suffered only 13 killed and 27 wounded. Following the engagement Warren returned to Britain with his prizes, leaving the eastern half of the Atlantic temporarily unguarded.

== Willaumez in the Caribbean ==
At the beginning of April 1806, Strachan was the only British admiral still hunting for Willaumez's squadron, following the withdrawal of Duckworth and Warren. Strachan's squadron was hampered in its movements by the presence of the 98-gun HMS St George, which was much too slow to operate effectively with Strachan's fast response force. Returning to Britain in early April to resupply, Strachan detached St George and HMS Centaur (the new flagship of the Rochefort blockade) at Plymouth and was joined by three additional ships of the line and two frigates, all fast ships capable of extended operations. In early May, news reached Britain of Willaumez's stay at Salvador and his subsequent departure in mid-April, and Strachan was again ordered in pursuit, sailing for the West Indies.

On leaving Brazil, Willaumez first steered for the French colony of Cayenne, where he divided his ships into three squadrons to increase his raiding operations throughout the West Indies. In May he briefly considered an attack on Carlisle Bay, Barbados, but withdrew claiming that the wind and tide were against him. Cochrane, whose squadron was based at Carlisle Bay, came out in pursuit of the French and almost captured Jérôme Bonaparte in Vétéran with his flagship Northumberland, forcing the French ship to withdraw to Fort-de-France on Martinique on 9 June. Cochrane blockaded the port and was joined by HMS Elephant under Captain George Dundas and HMS Canada under Captain John Harvey, but Northumberland was damaged by a storm and the British temporarily withdrew to Saint Lucia, allowing Éole and Impétueux to reach Fort-de-France on 15 June. Over the following week the rest of Willaumez's squadron joined Vétéran, ignoring Cochrane's efforts to intercept his ships as they entered the harbour.

On 1 July Willaumez left Fort-de-France with two ships and sailed to Montserrat, seizing three merchant ships in the harbour. The British governor on Montserrat sent urgent messages to Nevis and St. Kitts, where the authorities hastily evacuated a 65-ship convoy anchored at Sandy Point under the meagre protection of the 28-gun frigate HMS Carysfort. However, 13 ships from other harbours missed the warning and on 3 July four ships that had detached from Willaumez's squadron the day before descended on the islands, seizing four vessels on Nevis and attacking the remaining nine that had gathered under Brimstone Hill. There gunfire from the Brimstone Hill batteries drove off the attacking French ships. On 4 July Willaumez rejoined the squadron from Montserrat with news that the annual Jamaica convoy, a large collection of merchant ships that sailed each year from the Caribbean to Britain during the summer, was anchored off Tortola. Cochrane had already recognised the danger to the Jamaica squadron and had overtaken Willaumez while he was at Montserrat, waiting for the French squadron off St. Thomas with four ships of the line and four frigates. On 6 July Willaumez sighted Cochrane south-east of St. Thomas and, heeding his orders from Napoleon not to risk battle, turned away and passed between St. Thomas and the Passage Islands. With the French driven off, Cochrane sailed to Tortola where nearly 300 ships had gathered to prepare the convoy for the journey to Europe.

Frustrated in his efforts to intercept the convoy at anchor, Willaumez determined to meet it at sea, sailing to the Bahama Banks. There he waited for the convoy, seizing any ships that came within sight of his squadron, including neutral vessels, in case they revealed his position. For several weeks Willaumez's lookouts saw nothing, the British holding the convoy back until they obtained some information about the location of the French squadron. During the night of 31 July, bored with waiting for the convoy, Captain Jérôme Bonaparte sailed northwards away from the squadron, acting without orders or even notifying his admiral. When dawn broke on 1 August, Willaumez was panicked by the disappearance of Vétéran and, assuming that the ship had somehow been accidentally separated, began to search for the missing vessel and its important commander.

While Willaumez was distracted by his missing ship, Cochrane had finished preparing the convoy. Unable to delay its departure any longer, he sent 109 large merchant ships eastwards under the protection of one small ship of the line, two frigates and two sloops, a significantly inferior force to the one under Willaumez. The convoy passed across Willaumez's cruising ground during August while the French admiral was to the north searching for Vétéran, and by the time he returned the convoy was far to the east, was well on its journey to Britain. Willaumez's absence also meant that he missed a potential encounter with Warren's squadron, which had returned to the Atlantic in search of Willaumez following its victory over Linois in March. Warren had sailed from Spithead on 4 June and by 12 July had anchored at Barbados. During August he searched for Willaumez in the eastern Bahamas but failed to discover the French squadron, which at that time was still searching for Vétéran far to the north.

== Hurricane ==
With his squadron unexpectedly depleted, his principal target escaped and food supplies running low, Willaumez decided to begin the final stage of his cruise and sail for Newfoundland, thereby escaping pursuit from Cochrane and Warren and preying on the convoys and fishing fleets that crossed the area. Turning northwards on 18 August, Willaumez was at 22°N 63°W, 324 nautical miles (600 km) north-east of Puerto Rico, when his squadron was struck by a fierce hurricane. When the storm abated, Willaumez found that his flagship Foudroyant was badly damaged and entirely alone. Rigging jury masts, Foudroyant began slowly limping for the Spanish port of Havana on Cuba, where she could make the repairs needed for the journey back to France. For nearly a month Willaumez encountered nothing, but on 15 September, with Havana in sight, the heavy British frigate HMS Anson under Captain Charles Lydiard appeared. Willaumez sent a boat into Havana for assistance as the frigate approached and at 13:15 Lydiard opened fire. Although Foudroyant was far larger than Anson she was significantly damaged and incapable of rapid manoeuvres, which gave Lydiard some hope of capturing her. However the fire of Willaumez's flagship proved too strong and at 13:45 Anson sheered away with two men killed and eight wounded. Spanish ships, including the ship of the line San Lorenzo came out to assist Foudroyant and within a few hours she was safely anchored in the heavily fortified harbour.

The rest of Willaumez's squadron was less successful in their attempts to reach safety. All were badly damaged and most had been blown north-west towards the Eastern Seaboard of the United States. There they encountered Strachan's squadron, which had passed through the Bahamas while Willaumez searched for Vétéran and been 60 nautical miles (110 km) from Willaumez when they were caught in the same hurricane that had dispersed the French squadron. Less damaged than their opponents, Strachan's ships began gathering off Chesapeake Bay with the intention of continuing their search once temporary repairs had been completed. On 14 September the ships of the line HMS Belleisle under Captain William Hargood, HMS Bellona under Captain John Erskine Douglas and the frigate HMS Melampus under Captain Stephen Poyntz were cruising off Cape Henry in search of Strachan's flagship HMS Caesar when they spotted a ship sailing under jury masts to the southwest. Closing to investigate, they discovered that the stranger was the French ship Impétueux, left in a dismasted and leaking state by the hurricane and desperately attempting to reach a harbour in the United States. Commodore Alain-Joseph Le Veyer-Belair immediately steered Impétueux towards the coast to avoid the unequal combat and drove his ship on shore at 08:15. Although Impétueux was now on United States soil, Melampus opened fire, the attack followed at 10:00 by boats from Belleisle and Bellona. Boarding parties seized Impétueux but the appearance of two sails on the horizon, later discovered to be British, convinced Hargood to abandon the wreck to Melampus. By 20:00 the remaining French crew had been taken aboard the frigate as prisoners and Poyntz gave orders for the wreck to be burnt.

The destruction of Impétueux on United States territory prompted complaints from the French consul at Norfolk, Virginia and from the captains of Éole and Patriote, which had sheltered in Annapolis following the storm. Badly damaged by the high winds, repairs on Patriote took over a year, Commodore Joseph-Hyacinthe-Isidore Khrom waiting until 16 December 1807 to make the journey back to France. He arrived at Ile d'Aix on 17 January 1808, narrowly avoiding the blockade squadron under Strachan that was temporarily out of position to take on fresh supplies. Éole was never repaired: the difficulty in obtaining the required naval stores proved too great and she was broken up at Annapolis in 1811. Another ship that never returned to France was the frigate Valeureuse, which sheltered in the Delaware River following the hurricane but was later forced to sail up river to Philadelphia to avoid attacks by British raiding parties. As with Éole, repairs proved too complex and Valeureuse was also broken up some years later. The flagship Foudroyant did succeed in returning to France, sailing from Havana late in 1806 and arriving at Brest in February 1807.

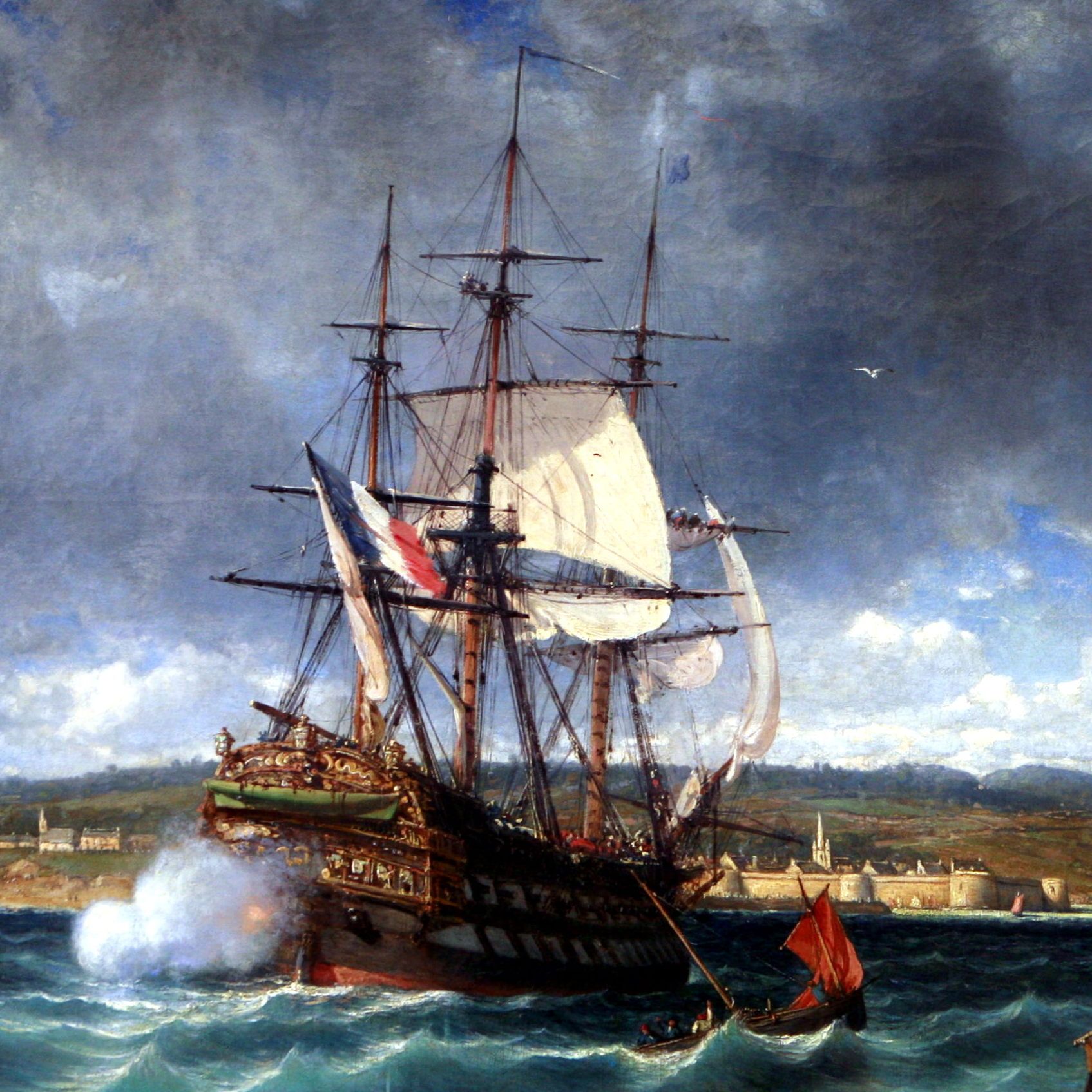
Vétéran entering Concarneau, by Michel Bouquet

Of the original squadron only two ships returned to France immediately: Vétéran had separated before the storm and Captain Bonaparte, assisted by a specially selected veteran crew, managed to intercept a convoy travelling from Quebec to Britain escorted only by the 22-gun HMS Champion under Captain Robert Howe Bromley on 10 August. Although Bromley made a desperate attempt to draw off the French ship of the line, Vétéran ignored the small escort ship and seized six merchant vessels, setting them on fire. Champion and the transport Osborne escaped, accompanied by nine other merchant ships. On 26 August 26 days after he deserted Willaumez's squadron, Bonaparte was nearing the French coast when he was chased by the 80-gun HMS Gibraltar under Captain Willoughby Lake and the frigates HMS Penelope and HMS Tribune under Captains William Robert Broughton and Thomas Baker. Closely pursued, the reliable officers placed under Bonaparte abandoned the intended destination of Lorient and instead used their expert local knowledge to direct Vétéran to the tiny port of Concarneau, the first time a ship of the line had ever successfully anchored in the harbour. Although another captain might have been court martialed for abandoning his admiral without orders or permission, the Emperor's brother was instead praised for intercepting the Quebec convoy and promoted soon afterwards. The other surviving ship of Willaumez's squadron was Cassard, which passed through the hurricane relatively intact and made its way to Europe alone, arriving at Rochefort several weeks later.

== Minor operations ==
In addition to the squadrons of Willaumez, Leissègues and Linois, the French authorities sent several other forces into the Atlantic during the campaign; either separate operations intended to pass unnoticed under the cover of the major campaign or deliberate diversionary expeditions to draw British forces away from the main theatre of operations. The first of these was L'Hermite's expedition, an expedition to West Africa under Commodore Jean-Marthe-Adrien l'Hermite that had sailed from Lorient towards the end of the Trafalgar campaign with orders to attack undefended merchant shipping off West Africa and await reinforcements under Jérôme Bonaparte. Before Bonaparte could sail, the Battle of Trafalgar changed the strategic situation and the reinforcements were never despatched. L'Hermite conducted an effective but minor raiding operation of his own, cruising off West Africa and capturing a number of merchant ships and slave ships, eventually sailing for Cayenne and then back to France in September 1806. A second force was less planned and more opportunistic: Lamellerie's expedition was drawn from frigates that had survived the Battle of Trafalgar and were sheltering in Cádiz. Duckworth withdrew from the blockade of Cádiz in November 1805, and inadequate replacements were provided by Collingwood. In February 1806, a British plan to lure the French squadron out of port by withdrawing all of the available forces except the frigate HMS Hydra and a brig backfired when a storm blew Hydra out of position on 26 February 1806 and La Meillerie escaped with four frigates and a brig. Hydra gave chase, and La Meillerie abandoned the slower brig to avoid combat with the British frigate, eventually escaping with his remaining ships. La Meillerie's expedition then visited Senegal and Cayenne, failing to make any impact on British merchant shipping despite orders to commerce raid when possible. After four months, La Meillerie decided to return to France, reaching the Bay of Biscay on in July 1806.

As well as the squadrons under Warren and Strachan, the British authorities had deployed additional forces in response to the French operations, in particular with the intention of intercepting and capturing Willaumez during his return journey to France. To this end, Louis was given a squadron to patrol in the English Channel and Admiral William Cornwallis maintained a powerful force off Brest, which was so successful in cutting off the seaport that L'Hermite's Régulus was the only ship of the line to enter or leave the port during 1806. Other squadrons were stationed off the remaining French Biscay ports, including a force of five ships of the line under Commodore Richard Goodwin Keats off Rochefort. One of Keats' ships, HMS Mars under Captain Robert Dudley Oliver was able to intercept La Meillerie's squadron on his return journey and capture the frigate Rhin on 17 July.

In September, Keats was replaced off Rochefort by Commodore Sir Samuel Hood, who achieved a significant success when he intercepted a French squadron of seven frigates and corvettes under Commodore Eleonore-Jean-Nicolas Soleil sailing from Rochefort to the French West Indies with supplies and reinforcements at the action of 25 September 1806. Hood, commanding six ships of the line, sighted Soleil's force at 01:00 on 25 September, within hours of it leaving Rochefort. Giving chase, conditions suited Hood's larger ships and by 04:00 Soleil recognised that he would be caught by the advancing British and detached three ships southwards and one to the north, retaining three others to delay the approaching British squadron, which had become separated during the pursuit. Engaging the lead ship, HMS Monarch under Captain Richard Lee, Soleil ordered his frigates to target her rigging in the hope of slowing Monarch's advance and escaping. Monarch was damaged in the battle, but remained in contact with the French long enough that Hood's flagship HMS Centaur and later HMS Mars could come up and join the engagement. In all four of the French frigates were captured, including the vessel sent north, which was caught by Mars. British casualties were nine killed and 29 wounded, the latter including Hood, who lost an arm.

L'Hermite's force had been caught in the same hurricane that had dispersed Willaumez, and as a result his ships were scattered and damaged on 20 August, one frigate joining the remains of Willaumez's squadron in the United States and the others limping back to France. Most succeeded in slipping through the British blockade independently, including Régulus, which arrived at Brest on 5 October, but one ship was less successful: on 27 September 1806 the frigate Président became the final French casualty of the campaign when it was trapped in the Bay of Biscay by Louis' squadron. Closed in from all sides, the approach of Louis' flagship Canopus convinced Captain Labrosse that continued resistance was impossible and he struck his colours without a fight.

== Aftermath ==
Although Allemand led a minor expedition from Brest to Toulon in 1808, and the Brest fleet under Willaumez made a determined if ineffectual effort to break into the Atlantic in early 1809 which ended at the Battle of Basque Roads, there were no other large scale naval campaigns fought in the Atlantic Ocean during the Napoleonic Wars. Minor operations by individual French ships and small squadrons continued, but the losses of 1805 and 1806, combined with the barring of Spanish ports after the Dos de Mayo Uprising and the seizure of much of the French West Indies in 1809, reduced both the need and the ability of the French to operate on a large scale in the Atlantic: Lord Barham recognised this when he commented on hearing the news of the victory at San Domingo that it " puts us out off all fear from another predatory war in the West Indies".

In Britain the campaign emphasised the important lesson previously demonstrated in the Trafalgar campaign of the year before, that it was immensely difficult in the vastness of the Atlantic Ocean to detect and intercept French squadrons at sea: only off their own harbours and in the confined waters of the Caribbean were they vulnerable to detection and attack by British squadrons. The inadequate size and power of convoy escorts and the expense in resources employed in chasing French squadrons at sea meant that British trade was placed at risk by the depredations of independent French squadrons, and the maintenance of a tight blockade was essential. The British grip on French maritime travel was a constant source of irritation to Napoleon, who instigated a massive shipbuilding program with the intention of breaking the blockade: by 1808 he was able to muster over 80 ships of the line against the British blockade squadrons.
