= Action of 25 September 1806 =

1806 battle of the Napoleonic Wars

- Part of the Napoleonic Wars
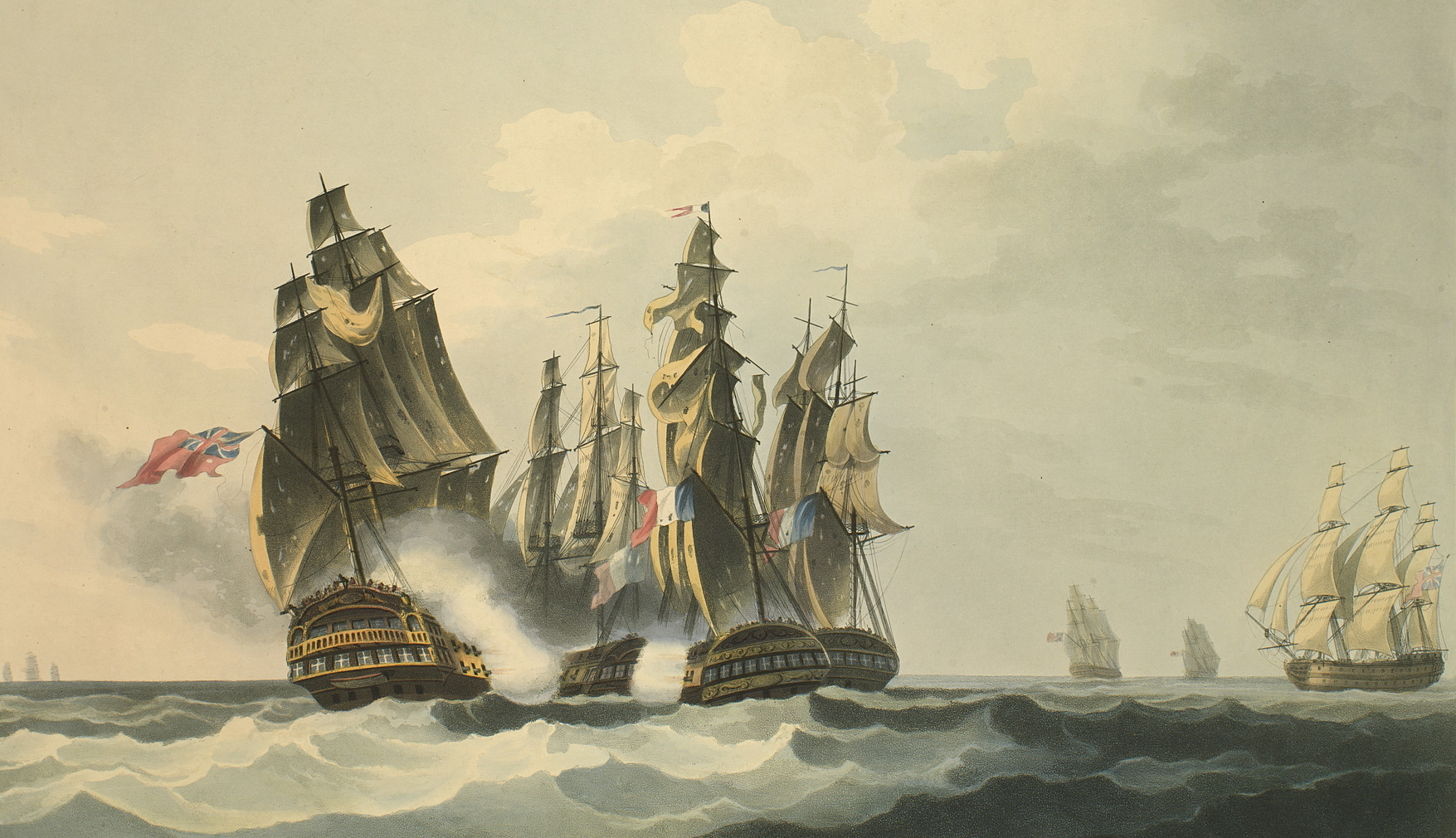
- British illustration of the battle
Date	25 September 1806
Location	Bay of Biscay, Atlantic Ocean
Result	British victory

Belligerents
United Kingdom	France

Commanders and leaders
Samuel Hood	Éléonore-Jean-Nicolas Soleil (surrendered)

Strength
6 ships of the line 1 brig	5 frigates 2 corvettes

Casualties and losses
9 killed 29 wounded	Unknown killed or wounded 4 frigates captured

The action of 25 September 1806 was a naval battle fought during the Napoleonic Wars off the French Biscay port of Rochefort. A French squadron comprising five frigates and two corvettes, sailing to the French West Indies with supplies and reinforcements, was intercepted by a British squadron of six ships of the line that was keeping a close blockade of the port as part of the Atlantic campaign of 1806. The British ships, under the command of Commodore Sir Samuel Hood, spotted the French convoy early in the morning of 25 September, just a few hours after the French had left port, and immediately gave chase. Although the French ships tried to escape, they were heavily laden with troops and stores, and the strong winds favoured the larger ships of the line, which caught the French convoy after a five-hour pursuit, although they had become separated from one another during the chase.

At 05:00 the leading British ship, HMS Monarch, was within range and opened fire on the French squadron, which divided. One frigate went north and was intercepted by HMS Mars, while another, accompanied by the two corvettes, turned south and managed to outrun HMS Windsor Castle. The main body of the French force remained together and met the attack of Monarch and the British flagship HMS Centaur with their broadsides. Although outnumbered and outclassed by the British squadron the French ships fought hard, inflicting damage on the leading British ships and severely wounding Commodore Hood. Eventually the strength of the British squadron told, and despite a fierce resistance the French ships surrendered one by one, the British capturing four of the seven vessels in the squadron.

== Background ==
The principal naval campaign of 1806 was fought in the Atlantic Ocean, following a raid by two large French battle squadrons on British trade routes, focused particularly on the Caribbean. The security of the French Caribbean was under severe threat during the wars, as the Royal Navy dominated the region and restricted French movements both between the islands and between the West Indies and France itself. This dominance was enforced by rigorous blockade, in which British ships attempted to ensure that no French military or commercial vessel was able to enter or leave French harbours both in Europe and in the French colonies. In the Caribbean, this strategy was designed to destroy the economies and morale of the French West Indian territories in preparation for attack by British expeditionary forces. To counter this strategy, the French government repeatedly sent convoys and individual warships to the French Caribbean islands with supplies of food, military equipment and reinforcements. These resupply efforts ranged from small individual corvettes to large battle squadrons and were under orders to avoid conflict wherever possible. Despite these orders, many were intercepted by British blockade forces, either in the Caribbean or off the French coast itself.

The largest French resupply effort of the Napoleonic Wars was a squadron under Counter-admiral Corentin Urbain de Leissègues, sent to Santo Domingo in December 1805 with troops and supplies. In conjunction with a second squadron under Vice-Admiral Jean-Baptiste Willaumez, this force was then ordered to raid British trade routes and disrupt the movement of British merchant shipping across the Atlantic. Leissègues reached Santo Domingo in February 1806, but within days a British battle squadron had intercepted and destroyed his force at the Battle of San Domingo. Willaumez was able to avoid attack by British forces during the spring of 1806, and cruised in the Caribbean during much of the summer, but his force was eventually dispersed by a hurricane in August and the survivors forced to shelter on the American Eastern Seaboard. Unaware of the dispersal of Willaumez's squadron, the British naval authorities sought to block its return to Europe by stationing strong battle squadrons off the principal French Atlantic ports. One of their most important targets was the city of Rochefort, heavily fortified port in which a powerful French naval force was based, and a squadron of six Royal Navy ships of the line was assigned to watch it in case Willaumez attempted to return there. In August, command of the blockade squadron was awarded to Commodore Sir Samuel Hood, a highly experience naval commander.

In Rochefort, an expedition was planned to carry supplies to the French West Indies while the British were distracted by Willaumez's operations. Assigned to the operation was Commodore Éléonore-Jean-Nicolas Soleil, an officer who had served on Allemand's expedition, a successful operation the year before. To carry the supplies and reinforcements, Soleil was provided with seven ships: Four large modern frigates rated at 40-guns but actually carrying 44–46, a smaller and older frigate of 36 guns and two small corvettes of 16 guns each. All of the ships were heavily laden, each carrying as many as 650 men, but it was hoped that their size and speed would allow them to defeat anything smaller than they were and to escape anything larger.

== Battle ==
Soleil's squadron departed Rochefort on the evening of 24 September, aiming to bypass Hood's squadron in the dark. However at 01:00 on 25 September, with the wind coming from the northeast, lookouts on HMS Monarch spotted sails to the east. Hood's squadron was spread out, tacking southeast towards the Chassiron Lighthouse at Saint-Denis-d'Oléron with HMS Centaur in the centre, HMS Revenge to the east (or windward) and Monarch to the west. HMS Mars was also close by, with the rest of the squadron spread out in the rear. Hood's immediate reaction was that the sails must belong to a squadron of French ships of the line, and ordered his ships to form a line of battle in anticipation. Even as the signal was raised however, lookouts on Monarch identified the strangers as frigates and Hood abandoned his previous orders and raised a new signal ordering a general chase, confident that his ships could destroy the convoy even without the power and defensive capability of a line of battle.

As soon as Soleil realised that he had been spotted he gave orders for his ships to sail to the southwest as fast as possible, hoping to outdistance the British squadron. However his convoy were all heavily laden and were therefore slower than they would normally be, while the heavy swell and strong winds favoured the large ships of the line. The chase continued throughout the night, until by 04:00 Monarch was clearly gaining on the convoy, with Centaur 8 nautical miles (15 km) behind. At 05:00, Captain Richard Lee was close enough to fire his bow-chasers, small guns situated at the front of his ship, at the rearmost French frigate, the Armide. Captain Jean-Jacques-Jude Langlois returned the fire with his stern-chasers and the French ships raised their ensigns in anticipation of battle. Recognising that he was facing an overwhelming British force, Soleil split his ships, sending Thétis and the corvettes Lynx and Sylphe southwards and Infatigable to the north. This had limited success in achieving the desired effect of dividing the pursuit, with Captain William Lukin taking HMS Mars out of the British line in pursuit of Infatigable while the slow HMS Windsor Castle was sent after the three south bound ships, but the main body of the Royal Navy squadron remained on course.

At 10:00, Soleil accepted that his remaining ships would rapidly be overhauled by Monarch and drew them together, forming a compact group with which to receive the British attack. He also ordered his captains to focus their fire on the enemy sails, rigging and masts, hoping to inflict enough damage to delay the pursuit and allow his force to escape. Within minutes Monarch was heavily engaged with Armide and Minerve but Captain Lee found himself at a disadvantage: the heavy swell that had suited his ship during the chase also prevented him from opening his lower gunports in case of flooding. This halved his available cannon and as a result his isolated ship began to suffer severe damage to its rigging and sails from the frigates' gunnery. Within 20 minutes, Monarch was unable to manoeuvree, but Lee continued fighting until Centaur could reach the melee, the flagship opening fire at 11:00. Hood passed the battling Monarch and Minerve, concentrating his fire on Armide and the flagship Gloire. For another 45 minutes the battle continued, Centaur suffering damage to her rigging and sails from the French shot and taking casualties from musket fire from the soldiers carried aboard. Among the wounded was Commodore Hood, who was shot in the right forearm, the ball eventually lodging in his shoulder. Hood retired below and command passed to his second in command, Lieutenant Case.

At 11:45, Armide surrendered to Centaur, followed 15 minutes later by Minerve. Both ships had suffered heavy damage and casualties in the unequal engagement and could not hope to continue their resistance with the rest of the British squadron rapidly approaching. To the north, Infatigable had failed to outrun Mars and Captain Lukin forced the frigate to surrender after a brief cannonade. With three ships lost and the other three long disappeared to the south, Soleil planned to flee westwards, hoping the damage he had inflicted on Centaur's sails was sufficient to prevent her pursuit. However, Gloire had also been damaged and could not distance herself from the British flagship sufficiently before support arrived in the form of Mars. With his ship undamaged, Lukin was able to easily catch the fleeing frigate and opened fire at 14:30, combat continuing for half an hour before Soleil surrendered, his frigate badly damaged. To the south, Windsor Castle had proven far too slow to catch the smaller French ships, which had easily outrun the second rate and escaped.

== Aftermath ==
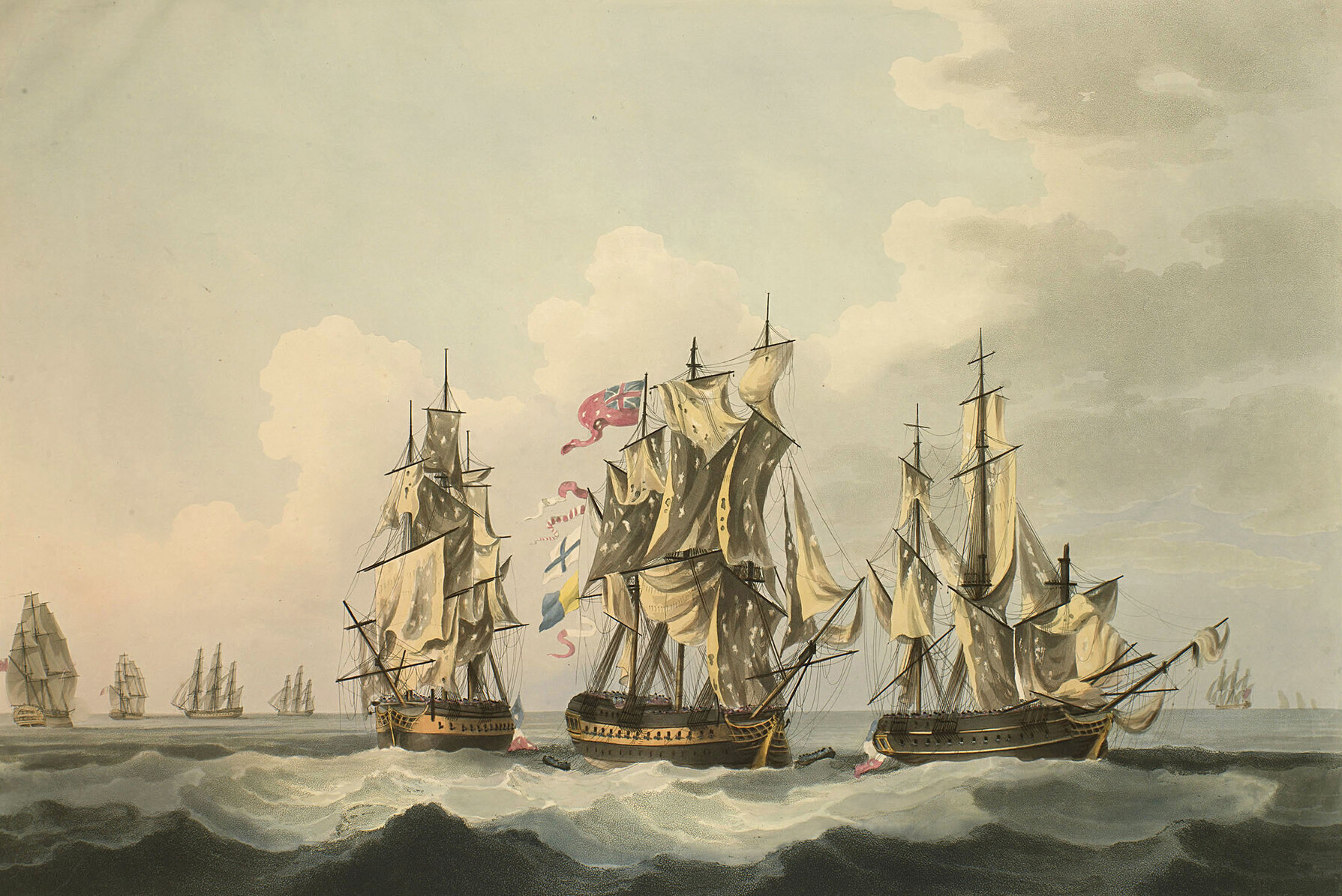
Monarch with her two prizes, Minerve and Armide, in tow

It took some time for the British squadron to effect repairs on their ships and prizes in preparation for the journey back to Britain. They had suffered light casualties of nine killed and 29 wounded, but among the more seriously injured was Hood, whose arm had been amputated during the battle. (Note: The despatch written by Hood in the immediate aftermath lists nine killed including six on Monarch, a figure accepted by William Laird Clowes (who does not provide a breakdown). William James however gives only seven killed including four on Monarch, without giving a source for his figures. All sources agree that 29 British personnel were wounded.) French losses were much heavier but are unknown: Hood did not include them in his official report but promised to provide them soon afterwards in a follow-up letter, which, if it was written, has never been located. All four of the captured frigates were large new vessels that were immediately purchased for service in the Royal Navy, Gloire and Armide retaining their names while Infatigable became HMS Immortalite and Minerve became HMS Alceste. Although Hood and his men were commended at the time, subsequent historical focus has been on the bravery of the inexperienced French crews in resisting an attack by an overwhelming force for so long. William James wrote in 1827 of the "gallant conduct on the part of the French ships" and William Laird Clowes, writing in 1900 stated that "The resistance offered by the French to a force so superior was in every way credible".

Within days of the action Hood had been promoted to rear-admiral and awarded a pension of £500 a year, but despite his wound he continued in service, fighting a notable action with Russian ships in the Baltic Sea in 1807 and later operating off the Spanish coast in the early Peninsular War. French efforts to resupply their West Indian colonies continued throughout the next three years, costing a heavy toll of men and ships lost to the British blockade. By 1808, the situation in the French Caribbean had become desperate and the French increased their supply convoys, losing five frigates and a ship of the line in failed reinforcement efforts during late 1808 and early 1809. The weakened colonies were unable to resist British attack, and co-ordinated invasions forced the surrender of first Martinique in January 1809 and Guadeloupe a year later, Cayenne and Santo Domingo also falling to British, Spanish and Portuguese forces.

== Order of battle ==
Commodore Hood's squadron
Ship	Rate	Guns	Navy	Commander	Casualties			Notes
Ship	Rate	Guns	Navy	Commander	Killed	Wounded	Total	Notes
HMS Monarch	Third-rate	74		Captain Richard Lee	6	18	24	Suffered severe damage to rigging and masts.
HMS Centaur	Third-rate	74		Commodore Sir Samuel Hood	3	4	7	Suffered severe damage to rigging and masts.
HMS Mars	Third-rate	74		Captain William Lukin	0	0	0	Suffered minor damage to rigging and hull.
HMS Windsor Castle	Second-rate	98		Captain Charles Boyles	0	0	0	Not engaged during the battle.
HMS Achille	Third-rate	74		Captain Richard King	0	0	0	Not engaged during the battle.
HMS Revenge	Third-rate	74		Captain Sir John Gore	0	0	0	Not engaged during the battle.
HMS Atalante	Brig	16		Commander John Ore Masefield	0	0	0	Not engaged during the battle.
Casualties: 9 killed, 29 wounded, 38 total.

Commodore Soleil's squadron
Ship	Class	Guns	Navy	Commander	Casualties	Notes
Gloire	Frigate	40		Commodore Éléonore-Jean-Nicolas Soleil	Heavy	Captured with surviving crew. Later commissioned as HMS Gloire.
Minerve	Frigate	40		Frigate Captain Joseph Collet	Heavy	Captured with surviving crew. Later commissioned as HMS Alceste.
Armide	Frigate	40		Commander Jean-Jacques-Jude Langlois	Heavy	Captured with surviving crew. Later commissioned as HMS Armide.
Infatigable	Frigate	40		Frigate Captain Joseph-Maurice Girardias	Minor	Captured with surviving crew. Later commissioned as HMS Immortalite.
Thétis (Note: William James, following Hood's original despatch, reports this ship as Thémis under Captain Nicolas Jurgan, but all other sources give Thétis under Captain Jacques Pinsum.)	Frigate	36		Frigate Captain Jacques Pinsum	None	Not engaged during battle.
Lynx	Corvette	16		Lieutenant Fargenel	None	Not engaged during battle.
Sylphe	Corvette	16			None	Not engaged during battle.
Total casualties: unknown, believed to be heavy.

== Bibliography ==
- Clowes, William Laird (1997) [1900]. The Royal Navy, A History from the Earliest Times to 1900, Volume V. Chatham Publishing. ISBN 1-86176-014-0.
- Gardiner, Robert, ed. (2001) [1998]. The Victory of Seapower. Caxton Editions. ISBN 1-84067-359-1.
- James, William (2002) [1827]. The Naval History of Great Britain, Volume 4, 1805–1807. Conway Maritime Press. ISBN 0-85177-908-5.
- Woodman, Richard (2001). The Sea Warriors. Constable Publishers. ISBN 1-84119-183-3.
