= Richard Lee (Royal Navy officer) =

Royal Naval Admiral (c. 1765–1837)

Admiral Sir Richard Lee KCB
- Born: c. 1765
- Died: 5 August 1837; Walmer, Kent
- Military career
- Allegiance: United Kingdom
- Branch: Royal Navy
- Service years: 1777–1837
- Rank: Admiral
- Conflicts: American Revolutionary War; Battle of Cape St Vincent; Battle of Martinique; Great Siege of Gibraltar; Battle of Cape Spartel; French Revolutionary Wars; Napoleonic Wars; Battle of Cape Ortegal; Action of 25 September 1806; Walcheren Expedition
- Awards: Knight Commander of the Order of the Bath, Knight Commander of the Order of the Tower and Sword

Admiral Sir Richard Lee KCB (c. 1765 – 5 August 1837) was an officer of the British Royal Navy who served in the American Revolutionary War, the French Revolutionary Wars and the Napoleonic Wars. His early career was marked by his participation in a number of important battles during the American war, during the French Revolutionary Wars he spent an unremarkable period of time in the Caribbean, but during the Napoleonic Wars he was again prominent, participating heavily in a number of important engagements.

In 1812, Lee was promoted to rear-admiral and was unable to get an appointment, his future as a serving officer in doubt. Although he never again served in an active capacity, he continued to receive promotions and rewards for his lengthy service, both from the British and Portuguese royal families. He died at his home in Walmer, Kent in 1837 at the age of 72 as a full admiral.

== Early life ==
Richard Lee was born in approximately 1765, entering the Royal Navy at the age of just 12 as a midshipman on the sloop HMS Speedwell, then captained by Commander John Harvey. Lee later transferred to the ship of the line HMS Triumph, which was attached to the fleet under Admiral Sir George Rodney.

With Rodney, Triumph participated in the victory over the Spanish at the Battle of Cape St Vincent and the inconclusive Battle of Martinique against the French during 1780. Later in the year, Rodney's fleet sailed to New York City and en route seized the captured armed Jamaica ship Lion.

Lee was made master of Lion and cruised the coastline near Sandy Hook, on one occasion fighting a brief engagement with the American privateer Retaliation, which was driven into Neversink. For his services, Lee was promoted to lieutenant and awarded a large financial reward from the merchants of New York.

== Career ==
In 1781, Lee returned to Britain and joined first HMS Recovery and then HMS Raisonnable, in which he participated in the relief of Gibraltar during the Great Siege. With the fleet under Lord Howe, Lee subsequently participated in the indecisive Battle of Cape Spartel. Lee remained in service during the peace that followed, initially on HMS Swallow and then on the fourth rate HMS Centurion in the West Indies under Rear-Admiral Philip Affleck.

Under Affleck's patronage, Lee received a promotion to commander in HMS Serpent and acted as a convoy escort during the opening months of the French Revolutionary Wars, for which service he was given substantial financial rewards by the convoy's merchants and insurers. Serpent was subsequently deployed in support of allied forces during the siege of Nieuwpoort, returning in June 1794 when Lee was promoted to post captain.

Lee's first full command was HMS Hind in the English Channel, followed by HMS Greyhound in the Caribbean and HMS Assistance in the Channel once more. In 1802, Lee survived the loss of Assistance in a shipwreck off Dunkirk, when two hired maritime pilots grounded the vessel on a sandbar. Two men were drowned in the wreck, and Lee was subsequently admonished for placing too much trust in hired pilots.

The pilots were each imprisoned for six months. After three years unemployed, Lee returned to service in early 1805, taking over the 74-gun HMS Courageux and joining the squadron under Sir Richard Strachan in the Bay of Biscay. On 4 November 1805, Courgueux was heavily engaged at the Battle of Cape Ortegal, in which four French ships of the line that had escaped from the Battle of Trafalgar were defeated and captured.

=== HMS Monarch ===
In 1806, Lee took command of HMS Monarch, and again took part in an important action while serving with the blockade squadron under Sir Samuel Hood off Rochefort. At the action of 25 September 1806, seven French ships attempted to break out the port for the West Indies. Intercepted within hours by Hood's squadron of ships of the line, the French fled, only Monarch managing to keep in touch.

In the ensuing engagement, four French frigates were captured although Monarch suffered considerable damage to her masts and rigging. Over the next several years, Lee was employed in the blockade of the Tagus, assisting the flight of the Portuguese Royal family in 1807 and negotiating peace with the Spanish forces in the Rio de la Plata.

== Later life ==
In 1809, after his return to Britain, Lee joined the disastrous Walcheren Expedition, and remained in Monarch in the North Sea until 1812, when his ship was deemed no longer serviceable and broken up. Advanced to rear-admiral, Lee was unable to secure a commission at sea and effectively retired from the service, although he continued to rise in rank and stature. He became a vice-admiral in 1821 and a full admiral in 1830. He died on 5 August 1837, at his home in Walmer, Kent.

== Awards ==
In 1815, he was made a Knight Commander of the Order of the Bath and in 1816 was awarded the Order of the Tower and Sword by the Portuguese Royal family in recognition of his services towards them.
