= Éléonore-Jean-Nicolas Soleil =

Éléonore-Jean-Nicolas Soleil (6 January 1767 – 11 March 1824) was a French Navy officer.

== Biography ==
Born to the family of a surgeon, Soleil started sailing on a merchantman in 1783. In 1785, he served in the French Royal Navy on a fluyt, before returning to merchant shipping.

In August 1789, Soleil joined up as a volunteer aboard on the Brillant. He returned to commerce again in 1790.

On 1 April 1793, Soleil joined the Navy as a midshipman first class, serving on Brillant again. In February 1794, he was promoted to ensign, and served on the Généreux from March.

Soleil was promoted to lieutenant in December 1794, and to commander in March 1796, serving as second captain on Généreux. In July 1796, he was appointed on the Formidable.

In May 1798, Soleil received command of the frigate Diane. He took part in the Battle of the Nile, managing to escape to Malta. In August 1800, as the Siege of Malta approached its conclusion and Malta was about to fall to the British, he was ordered back to France. Diane was however intercepted by the British blockade and captured by HMS Success, HMS Northumberland and HMS Genereux.

Back to France, Soleil was court-martialled for the loss of his frigate, as systematic in such cases, and found innocent of the capture. He was then briefly appointed to the Union before taking command of the frigate Volontaire.

Soleil was promoted to captain in September 1803 and appointed to the frigate Hermione. In May 1804, he took command of the 74-gun Lion in Allemand's expedition of 1805.

In September 1806, Soleil was given command of a 5-frigate and 2-corvette squadron in the Atlantic, with his flag on the Gloire. The squadron was bound for Martinique, with a 1600-man Army unit, along with ammunition and other military furniture. On 25 September 1806, four ships of the line under Sir Samuel Hood met and intercepted them, leading to the action of 25 September 1806. Four of the frigates were captured, and Soleil was taken prisoner by Captain William Lukin of HMS Mars.

Soleil was exchanged in September 1807. He was given command of the 74-gun Pultusk, and in 1809, of the Anversois.

From 1814, Soleil served in Cherbourg harbour. He retired in January 1816.

== Sources and references ==
- Dictionnaire des capitaines de vaisseau de Napoléon, Danielle & Bernard Quintin, SPM, 2003, ISBN 2-901952-42-9
