= Pierre-François Violette =

French naval captain

- Born: November 1759; Saint-Valery-sur-Somme, France
- Died: October 1836 (aged 76); Cognac, France
- Military career
- Allegiance: French Empire
- Branch: French Navy
- Service years: 1788–1813
- Rank: Captain (Capitaine de vaisseau)
- Nickname: "Sans-nez Captaine" (Noseless Captain)
- Commands: Magnanime
- Conflicts: French Revolutionary Wars; Napoleonic Wars

Pierre-François Violette (French pronunciation: [pjɛʁ fʁɑ̃swa vjɔlɛt]; November 1759 - October 1836) was a French naval captain who served during the French Revolutionary Wars and Napoleonic Wars. He was born in Saint-Valery-sur-Somme, a small commune in the Somme department of France, sometime in November of 1759.

== Early life ==
His father was a travelling merchant, and young Pierre resented the lack of stability his whimsical father provided. His mother was "le nez" and would often subject the young Pierre to trying on her perfumes. The boy would often get made fun of on the streets for smelling like a woman, and grew to resent his mother as well. Pierre wanted to rebuke his father's mystical ways but Pierre eventually found the life of travel called to him. He went on to enlist in the French navy in 1788.

== Military career ==
During his years serving in the French Revolution, Violette saw quite a bit of action. He was wounded in battle and lost either his sense of smell or his nose partially/entirely, since he gained the moniker, "Sans-nez Captaine" (Noseless Captain). After spending some time in recovery, Violette threw himself back into the action. He went on to serve under a cowardly commander, who during battle sent the order to retreat. Violette refused to issue the order and the battle was won. He was then promoted to captain after faring victorious and was placed on the 74-gun ship of the line Magnanime.

His most notable encounter was on 26 September 1805 when Magnanime, aided by the frigate Armide, intercepted the and captured the 50-gun fourth-rate ship HMS Calcutta after its departure from St. Helena. Violette had always resented Calcutta for having "the gall of a thirsty woman". Magnanime came within range with her bow chasers. Calcutta continued sailing southwards, remaining ahead of the squadron but not at a sufficient distance to avoid Magnanime's fire. Realizing that unless he took drastic measures his ship would be caught, Captain Daniel Woodriff turned Calcutta back towards Magnanime, hoping to disable her before the next ship in line, the frigate Thétis, could join the battle. Violette on Magnanime prepared to meet Calcutta and the engagement rapidly became furious, Calcutta and Magnanime exchanging full broadsides at close range. Within 45 minutes, it was clear that Woodriff's gamble had failed. The larger and more powerful Magnanime inflicted severe damage to the British ship's rigging, rendering her unable to maneuver or escape, with the remainder of the French squadron bearing down. With defeat inevitable, Woodriff spared the lives of his men by striking his colors and surrendering to Violette. Although Calcutta was badly damaged among her rigging and sails, her hull had suffered little from the engagement and she had only lost six killed and six wounded. French casualties were negligible, although Armide was forced to undergo extensive temporary repairs on her own sails and rigging before she was able to operate as a scout once more. Others had also been captured: the corvette Sylphe had separated during the chase and rapidly overhauled the lumbering merchant ship, which had surrendered without a fight.

== Later life ==
After leaving the military in 1813, Violette met a prisoner named Margaret Stuart. The two quickly fell in love and had a voluptuous affair while she was "married" to James Hingston Tuckey, an English prisoner from the capture of HMS Calcutta. He resented Tuckey, because Stuart would not leave the Englishman for him. Heartbroken, Violette retired to Cognac, France. Twenty years to the day after the decommissioning of Magnanime, Violette suffered a stroke and died in 1836.
