= Joseph Potaski =

Polish settler of Australia (1764–1824)

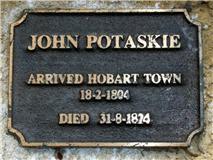
- Joseph Potaski's plaque at St. David's, Hobart
- Born: 1764; Poland
- Died: 1824 (aged 59–60); Hobart, Tasmania
- Conviction: Guilty
- Criminal charges: Stealing
- Penalty: Transportation

Joseph Potaski, or John Potaskie (c. 1764^{1} – 31 August 1824), was the first Pole to settle in Australia, and one of the first convicts to arrive in Van Diemen's Land on Ocean. Joseph Potaski worked hard to establish himself as a successful farmer in colonial Hobart. This was, however, undone by the exploits of his family. Joseph Potaski reflects the attitudes of those convicts who never progressed beyond their criminal past. Potaski is seen as representing the auspicious beginning of the Polish community in Australia.

His daughter, Catherine, was the first European born and baptised in the new colony of Van Diemen's Land.^{3}

== Early life ==
It is estimated that Potaski was born in 1764, in Poland. Not much is known of his early life. It has been suggested that Potaski was born into the aristocratic family of Potocki. It is also known that Potaski was a member of Kosciuszko's army. During this time Potaski would have been involved in the Warsaw siege and the Praga massacre. After the war Joseph Potaski arrived in London, probably as a refugee or asylum seeker.^{3}^{4}

== Transportation ==
On 27 March 1802, Potaski was arraigned before the Sussex Spring Assizes at Horsham, Sussex. Along with a John O'Brien, he faced charges of stealing a woman's hair shawl from Mrs. Pollard's shop in Newhaven, Sussex. Potaski was sentenced to several years' transportation to Australia. He was transported on the ship HMS Calcutta. His wife, Catherine and infant son, Joseph, also accompanied Potaski, as free settlers. Under the command of Lieutenant Colonel David Collins, the Calcutta left Portsmouth, and arrived at Port Phillip Bay on 9 October 1803. Collins was charged with establishing a new settlement, at present-day Sorrento, Victoria. However, he found the area to be unsuitable for settlement and departed on 20 January 1804 for Hobart. This time the Potaskis travelled on Ocean, which anchored at Risdon Cove on 17 February 1804. It was at this time that Catherine Potaski gave birth to a daughter, Catherine Jnr., the first person of European descent to be born and baptised in Tasmania. Potaski's wife, Catherine, was granted land at Clarence Plains, and Potaski himself received his freedom in 1810. By 1816 the Potaski family was supplying the colony with more corn than was needed for a whole year. The Potaskis also supplied the whole commissariat with wheat.

== Family ==
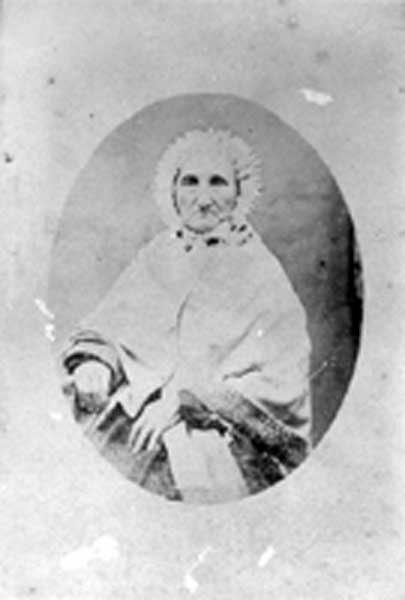
Catherine McDonald (née Potaski), 1804–1877. Courtesy of the Tasmanian Archive and Heritage Office

Joseph Potaski's, son Joseph Jnr. was convicted in March 1821 at Sydney, New South Wales, for being a part of a party that burgled Mr. Thrupp's house. Potaski Jnr. was hanged for the crime at Hobart on 28 April 1821. Joseph's sister, Catherine, had also been in trouble. In 1820, at the age of 16, Catherine had given birth to an illegitimate son, William. William died in 1823, at the age of three years. Catherine had also been accused of being a prostitute, and didn't enjoy the favour of Hobart's first Catholic chaplain, Father Conolly. However, Catherine was able to recover. She married on 29 June 1824, to Irishman Edward McDonald, at St. Virgils church, Hobart, Tasmania. Catherine and Edward had a large family, and eventually migrated to Lara, Victoria. Catherine died in Geelong, Victoria on 30 January 1877.

== Legacy ==
In the years before his death Potaski was once again in trouble with the law, this time for cattle rustling. He died on 31 August 1824 at Hobart. After his death the Potaskis left their land and migrated to Victoria. Potaski's wife, Catherine, died in 1859 at Geelong, Victoria. Joseph Potaski is immortalised on a plaque in Hobart's St. David's Memorial Park. On 9 October 2003, a concert was held in Hobart, to celebrate the 200th anniversary of Joseph Potaski arriving in Australia. Television presenter Yumi Stynes and politician Denis Napthine are amongst the Potaski descendants.

== See also ==
- List of convicts transported to Australia

== Notes ==
1.There is some conjecture about Potaski's specific year of birth, with different sources suggesting 1762, 1764 and 1774.

2. Some sources also suggest that Potaski also identified with the name John.^{3}
