= Indus (1803 ship) =

19th century British-built ship known for trading with India

History

United Kingdom
- Name: Indus
- Owner: EIC voyages #1–5:William Borradaile; EIC voyage #6:Richardson Borradaile
- Builder: Simon Temple Jnr, South Shields Newcastle-upon-Tyne
- Launched: 6 October 1803
- Fate: Last listed in 1823 (RS), or 1825 (LR)

General characteristics
- Tons burthen: 567, 56763/94, or 590, or 600, or 60029/94, or 601 (bm)
- Length: Overall:122 ft 5 in (37.3 m); Keel:98 ft 0 in (29.9 m)
- Beam: 33 ft 0 in (10.1 m)
- Depth of hold: 13 ft 5 in (4.1 m)
- Complement: 55
- Armament: 1806: 18 × 12-pounder carronades; 1815: 2 × 12-pounder carronades

Indus was launched in 1803 at Newcastle on Tyne. In 1804 the British East India Company (EIC) hired her for six voyages to India as an "extra ship". She completed the last of these six voyages in 1814. Thereafter she continued to trade with India, but privately, sailing under a licence from the EIC. She was last listed in 1823.

== Career ==
On 14 March 1804 the EIC engaged Indus for six voyages at a rate of £13 9s per ton, peace freight, and £9 per ton, contingencies, for 590 tons.

1st EIC voyage (1804–1805): Captain George Weltden acquired a letter of marque on 5 May 1806. He sailed from Portsmouth on 4 September 1804, bound for Madras. Indus was at Madeira on 27 September. On 10 January 1805,French frigate Psyché captured the country ship Elisa. However, Indus recaptured Eliza, Waters, master; Eliza then went into Madras. Indus arrived at Madras on 17 February 1805.

Homeward bound, Indus was at St Helena on 20 July. Indus was part of a convoy under the escort of HMS Calcutta. The convoy encountered French Admiral Allemand's squadron on 25–26 September. Calcutta ordered the vessels of the convoy to make their own way home and herself sailed to lure the French away. Eventually, the French captured Calcutta, but in the interim the convoy had escaped. Indus reached Crookhaven on 1 October. She arrived at the Downs on 24 November.

The owners and underwriters of Indus, and her cargo, proposed a subscription of 21 per cent on the amount insured. The resulting money was to be presented to the Calcutta's captain, officers, and crew, as a small token of gratitude.

2nd EIC voyage (1806–1807): Captain Weltden sailed from Portsmouth on 10 June 1806, bound for Madras and Bengal. Indus was at Madeira on 28 June and the Cape on 3 October. She reached Madras on 20 December, and arrived at Diamond Harbour on 7 February 1807. From there she sailed to Madras, which she reached on 3 April. She returned to Calcutta on 30 April. She was again at Madras on 20 July and she arrived at the Downs on 3 December.

3rd EIC voyage (1808–1809): Captain Weltden sailed from Portsmouth on 6 May 1808, bound for Madras and Bengal. She was at Madeira on 30 May and the Cape on 2 August. She reached Madras on 30 September and arrived at Calcutta on 1 November. Homeward bound she was at Sagar on 23 January 1809. She was at Point de Galle on 7 February, the Cape on 11 April, and St Helena on 30 April. She arrived at the Downs on 14 July.

4th EIC voyage (1810–1811): Captain Weltden sailed from Portsmouth on 13 April 1810, bound for Madras and Bengal. Indus was at Madeira on 19 May and reached Madras on 12 October. She arrived at Calcutta on 18 November. Homeward bound, she was at Sagar on 5 January 1811. She was at Vizagapatam on 31 January, Madras on 26 February, and St Helena on 18 June. She arrived at the Downs on 31 August.

5th EIC voyage (1812–1813): Captain Weltden sailed from Portsmouth on 8 April 1812, bound for Madras and Bengal. Indus was at Madeira on 24 April and Madras on 17 September. She arrived at Calcutta on 3 November. Homeward bound, she was at Madras on 19 February 1813, and St Helena on 25 June. She arrived at the Downs on 7 November.

6th EIC voyage (1814–1815): Captain Weltden sailed from Portsmouth on 8 June 1814, bound for Madeira and Bombay. She was at Madeira on 23 June, and arrived at Bombay on 15 November. Homeward bound, she was at Tellicherry on 10 January 1815, the Cape on 7 March, and St Helena on 25 April. She arrived at the Downs on 23 June.

From 1815 Indus continued in private trade to India as a licensed ship. In 1813 the EIC had lost its monopoly on the trade between India and Britain. British ships were then free to sail to India or the Indian Ocean under a licence from the EIC. Her owners had applied for a licence on 5 January 1815 and were granted one on 9 January.

Indus first appeared in the Register of Shipping (RS) in 1816.

Year	Master	Owner	Trade	Source
1816	Oldham	Borodale	London–India	RS

T.W.Aldham sailed from London on 7 February 1816, bound for Fort William, India.

== Fate ==
Indus was last listed in the Register of Shipping in 1822 with data unchanged since 1816. She was last listed in LR in 1825 with the same data.
