= Ocean (1794 ship) =

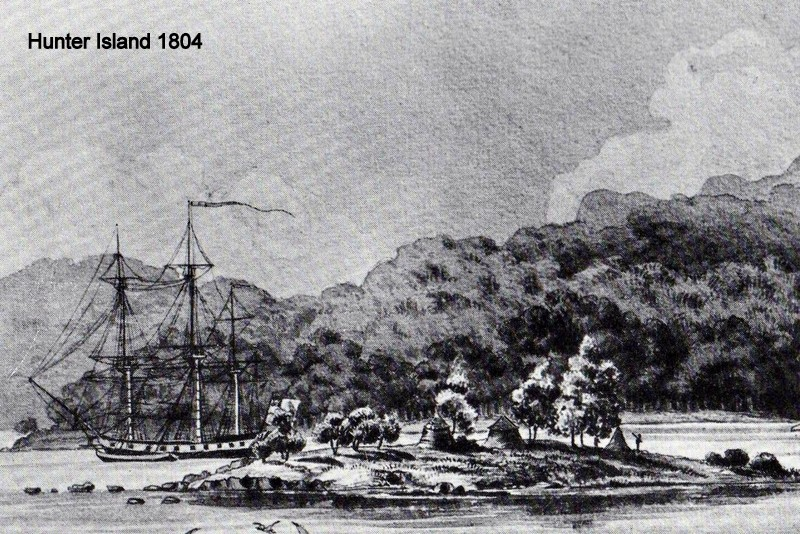
- Hunter Island with the ships Ocean and Pilgrim in foreground and the Lady Nelson behind the flag on Ocean's stern, 1804.

History

Great Britain
- Name: Ocean
- Owner: Messrs Hurry & Co
- Launched: 1794, South Shields
- Fate: Last listed in Lloyd's Register in 1823

General characteristics
- Class & type: Brig
- Tons burthen: 461, 481, or 5614/94 (bm)
- Length: 109 ft 9 in (33.5 m) (overall), 86 ft 5 1/4 in (26.3 m) (keel)
- Beam: 31 ft 81 in (11.5 m)
- Depth of hold: 13 ft 1 in (4.0 m)
- Propulsion: Sail
- Sail plan: Brig
- Complement: 35–40
- Armament: 10 or 12 × 6-pounder guns
- Notes: Copper-sheathed

Ocean was an English merchant ship and whaler built in 1794, at South Shields, England. She performed two voyages as an "extra" ship for the British East India Company (EIC) and later, in 1803, she accompanied HMS Calcutta to Port Phillip. The vessels supported the establishment of a settlement under the leadership of Lt Col David Collins. Calcutta transported convicts, with Ocean serving to transport supplies. When the settlers abandoned Port Phillip, Ocean, in two journeys, relocated the settlers, convicts and marines to the River Derwent (Hobart Town) in 1804.

Ocean continued to sail as a London-based transport until 1823.

== Description ==
Ocean was a three-masted, copper-sheathed brig. She was built in 1794 at South Shields.

Originally, Ocean was to be a whaler owned by the newly operating South Sea fishers, Thomas and Edward Hurrys, who were bankrupt by 1806. However, apparently Ocean spent 1794–95 in the Baltic timber trade.

== East India Company ==
Ocean made two trips to Bengal as an "extra" ship for the EIC. That is, the EIC chartered her on a per-voyage basis, rather than having her on long-term contract; extra ships were usually smaller than the regular East Indiaman. The French Revolutionary Wars having started, she sailed under letters of marque for both voyages.

=== EIC voyage #1 (1796–1798) ===
The first letter was issued on 22 January 1796, and gave her captain's name as John Bowen. Under Bowen (or Bower), she left Gravesend on 17 February 1796, and was at Portsmouth on 12 March. She was at Cowes on 30 March, where she took on board men from the 28th Light Dragoons. She then joined a convoy for the Cape of Good Hope on 11 April. The convoy included another Ocean, this one an East Indiaman, and much larger. On 10 September, the brig Ocean was at Simon's Bay. On 28 November, she was at Diamond Harbour and by 30 December, she was at Calcutta. She left Diamond Harbour on 10 January 1797. Ocean was at Kedgeree on 19 March. She left Bengal on 27 March 1797, with a cargo of sugar and in a convoy escorted by the frigate HMS Fox. She reached Trincomalee on 24 April, Simon's Bay on 7 July, and the Cape on 11 July, a storm having dispersed the convoy and despite having sprung leaks that had kept the crew at the pumps from 26 May on. She sailed from the Cape on 26 August, as part of a convoy of 16 East Indiamen and six British warships, reaching Saint Helena on 11 September. Ocean reached the Downs on 14 December, Gravesend, Kent on 18 December, and finished unloading at Deptford on 19 January 1798.

=== EIC voyage #2 (1798–1800) ===
In 1798, she was repaired by Fletcher. She received her second letter of marque on 30 July 1798. That letter gave her captain's name as Robert Abbon Mash. On 4 October 1798, she sailed for Bengal. She reached the Cape of Good Hope on 14 January 1799, Madras on 9 May, Coringa on 16 June, and Calcutta on 17 July. On the return leg she was at Diamond Harbour on 25 September, and Kedgeree by 23 October. By 26 January 1800, Ocean was at Saint Helena, and reached the Downs on 30 May. She returned to her moorings in Britain on 1 June.

== Transport to Australia ==
The British Government chartered Ocean from Messrs Hurry & Co as a supply ship for the journey from Portsmouth to Port Phillip. On the voyage to Port Phillip, she carried 100 people along with supplies needed for the settlement at Port Phillip. The people on Ocean included Captain John Mertho, nine officers, 26 seamen, eight civil officers including George Harris (a surveyor), and Adolarius Humphrey, a mineralogist, and a group of free settlers. Many of the free settlers had skills that would be of value to the new settlement – five were carpenters, two seamen, two millers, a whitesmith (works with white or light coloured metals such as tin or pewter), a stonemason, gardener, painter, schoolteacher, pocketbook maker (maker of wallets and covered notebooks) and two servants.

Ocean and Calcutta left Portsmouth on 27 April 1803, and reached Santa Cruz on the Island of Tenerife, part of the Canary Islands on 17 May 1803. Both ships sailed from Tenerife on 21 May, and arrived at Rio de Janeiro in Brazil on 29 June. While in Rio, Captain Woodriff of Calcutta sent five marines under Lieutenant Sladden to help maintain order on Ocean for the rest of the voyage. According to Reverend Robert Knopwood's journals, ‘Mr. Hartley, a settler had behaved badly’ – and it seemed there was little love lost between some of the free settlers and Captain Mertho. They apparently regarded him as a tyrant, while he thought they were intractable.

At Rio de Janeiro, seven sailors deserted Calcutta. Portuguese soldiers captured three of them and returned them to her, receiving a reward of £6 per sailor. While the ships were at berth, maintenance work was carried out on both ships and fresh provisions were taken on board for the next leg of the journey. Cloths were washed; repairs and adjustments made to the rigging of both ships and supplies of water were replenished. The fresh provisions included 36 turkeys, 13 dozen capons (roosters) and fowls, 68 very large ducks 4 geese, 13 pigs, and a large quantity of fruit and vegetables. Both Ocean and Calcutta left Rio on 19 July 1803.

Ocean, the slower of the two ships, was directed to sail direct to Port Phillip if she lost contact with Calcutta. The ships did lose contact so Ocean did not put in at Cape Town, arriving at Port Phillip on 7 October. At Cape Town two more sailors deserted Calcutta. One was captured and returned.

After leaving Rio, Ocean sailed through the Southern Atlantic and into the Indian Ocean. She experienced frightening weather conditions for 77 days. Twenty days out of Rio, George Harris recorded that ‘for many days we could not sit at table but were obliges to hold fast by boxes and on the floor and all our crockery were almost broken to pieces, besides many seas into the cabin and living in the state of darkness from the cabin windows being stopped up by the deadlights … I was never so melancholy in my life before’. In such conditions work on deck was extremely dangerous. On 9 August, John Bowers fell overboard and was lost. Ocean finally sighted land on course and off Port Phillip on 5 October; she was on course and off Port Phillip.

Ocean and Calcutta established the first settlement at Port Phillip in 1803 under the leadership of Lt Col David Collins.

While at Port Phillip, a number of convicts escaped. According to Rev. Robert Knopwood's journal, six convicts escaped from Sorrento on the evening of 27 December 1803. The settlement was in the process of closing down at the time, HMS Calcutta had already sailed for Port Jackson in New South Wales and Ocean was preparing to sail for Van Diemen's Land. The escaping convicts cut loose a boat from Ocean and succeed in getting to shore, where two were recaptured, one of whom, Charles Shaw, was shot and seriously wounded. The escapees intended to head north to Sydney, so they followed the bay to the mouth of the Yarra River, but there their scarce provisions ran out. They then tried heading inland for a way but before long the party separated. One, Daniel M'Allender, headed back to Sorrento and arrived in time to be taken on board Ocean. William Buckley decided to return to the beach alone and continued to follow the bay round to the opposite head in the hope of seeing and signalling to Ocean, but by this time it had left. Buckley lived with the aborigines in the area for 32 years and was next seen in 1835. Buckley's improbable survival is believed by many Australians to be the source of the vernacular phrase "Buckley's chance" (or simply Buckley's), which means "no chance", or "it's as good as impossible".

When this settlement was abandoned, Ocean, in two journeys, relocated the settlers, convicts, and marines to the River Derwent (Hobart Town) in 1804. She was there on 26 August, when Alexander was also there gathering whale oil from the "black whale".

Accounts record that Ocean fired a salute of 11 guns on the establishment of the settlement at Hobart.

== EIC service again ==
Ocean was released from service with His Majesty's government after moving Collins's settlers to Hobart. She sailed to Port Jackson and was there by 26 August 1804. At Port Jackson she took on fresh provisions.

On 24 October 1804, she sailed to New Zealand to engage in whaling.

She then sailed to Canton to China to pick up cargo. On her journey to China, Ocean sailed to the phosphate-rich Micronesian island of Banaba.

Captain John Mertho and Ocean are sometimes credited with the official European discovery of Banaba. Most sources credit the discovery to Captain Jared Gardner of the American vessel Diana on 3 January 1801.

From Banaba Ocean sailed on to the Marshall Islands in November. By 20 December, Ocean was at Whampoa. A month later, on 24 January 1805, she was at Macao. Another month saw her at Malacca on 25 February. She reached Saint Helena on 1 July, and The Downs on 16 September.

== Lloyd's Register ==
In 1806, Hurry & Co. sold Ocean to a "Bousfield". She continued to trade as a London transport. She was last listed in 1823. She appears rarely in the Register of Shipping, the last time in 1821.

Year	Master	Owner	Trade	Notes
1805	J. Martha (Note: J. Martha is almost certainly a misreading or transcription for John Mertoo.)	Hurry & Co.	London – China	10 guns
1806	J. Martha; Bousfield	Hurry & Co. Bousfield	London – China; London transport	10 guns
1807	Bousfield	Bousfield	London transport	10 guns
1808	Bousfield	Bousfield	London transport	10 guns
1809	Bousfield	Bousfield	London transport	10 guns
1810	Bousfield	Bousfield	London transport	10 guns
1811	Bousfield; J. Scott	Bousfield	London transport	10 guns
1812				Missing pages
1812	J. Scott	Bousfield	London—Cadiz	Register of Shipping
1813	J. Scott; Bousfield	Bousfield	London transport	10 guns
1814	Bousfield	Bousfield	London transport	10 guns
1815	Bousfield	Bousfield	London transport	10 guns
1816	Bousfield	Bousfield	London transport	
1818	Bousfield	Bousfield	London transport	
1819	Bousfield	Bousfield	London transport	
1820	Bousfield	Bousfield	London transport	
1821	Bousfield	Bousfield	London transport	Launched 1787; Register of Shipping
1823	Bousfield	Bousfield	London transport	

== Historical references ==
The voyage to Australia is well documented in a number of sources.

== Convicts and passengers known to have travelled on Ocean ==
- Samuel Lightfoot had arrived as a convict on the first fleet. He then received one of the first grants for land on the lower north shore of Port Jackson in the vicinity of Jeffrey Street, Sydney. Shortly after the expiration of his sentence, he returned to England, where he petitioned to be allowed to return with his wife, though she appears not to have sailed. Lightfoot subsequently returned to Australia and then traveled on the Ocean from Port Phillip, arriving in Tasmania in 1804. The Lieutenant-Governor of the new settlement at Port Phillip, David Collins subsequently appointed Lightfoot supervisor of the hospital in Hobart Town. Lightfoot died in 1818, aged 65.
- George Smith was a 22-year-old marine from the 62nd Company of Marines, Portsmouth Division. He had been born in Solihull, Warwickshire and his occupation was given as a butcher by trade. He was one of the marines who accompanied their commanding officer, Lieutenant Colonel Collins, aboard Ocean to Port Phillip. He married Grace Morrisby, eldest daughter of James and Ann, in 1810 – their children were all born at Clarence Plains.
- Ann Jane Hobbs, an American
- George Prideaux Harris was a Surveyor (Civil Official) and spent his early years at Exeter in Devon. In 1803, he was appointed deputy surveyor to David Collins and travelled to Port Phillip on Ocean. Soon after the Calcutta arrived, Harris along with Lieutenant James Tuckey, William Collins and William Gammon set out in the Calcutta's launch on a more detailed study of the area. They returned ten days later having travelled around Port Phillip.
- Leonard Fosbrook was a public servant appointed to the Collins expedition in 1803, at the last minute. He left England before instructions or a formal commission for his office as the Deputy Commissary could be issued. Still, he took charge of all government stores at Collins Settlement at Port Phillip. When David Collins moved the settlement to Van Diemen's Land, Fosbrook pitched his marquee on Hunter's Island, which became the site of the original commissariat store. For some years Fosbrook carried out his duties to Collins's entire satisfaction, but around August 1809, he resigned his office after a disagreement with the lieutenant-governor. The position of Deputy Commissary then went to George Harris. In April 1810, Fosbrook travelled to Sydney with the news of Governor David Collins's death. While there he successfully sought reinstatement as Deputy Commissary at Hobart Town. He was for a short time also appointed magistrate and first treasurer of the police fund.
- Matthew Bowden was a surgeon in the Royal Lancashire Regiment. In January 1803, he was commissioned as a civil assistant surgeon to accompany Lieutenant-Governor David Collins and his expedition to Port Phillip. When David Collins moved the settlement to Van Diemen's Land, Bowden was one of the first ashore, landing at Frederick Henry Bay on 12 February 1804. Bowden played a prominent role at Hobart attending to the sick. He was granted 100 acres (40 ha) of land at Humphrey's Rivulet in August 1804, where he had a vegetable garden and crops, and began to acquire livestock. Bowden attended Governor David Collins at his death in March 1810, then became first assistant surgeon of the civil medical establishment in Hobart. In October 1810 Governor Lachlan Macquarie granted him an additional 500 acres (200 ha) of land on the Derwent River. Bowden's sudden death on 23 October 1814, shocked the whole community of Hobart.
- Thomas Clark was 47 years old when he was appointed agricultural superintendent to sail with Lieutenant-Governor David Collins on the supply ship Ocean on 24 April 1803, for Port Phillip. After Collins decided to abandon Port Phillip and move the settlement to Van Diemens Land, Clark, then in charge of the convicts, supervised the reloading of stores onto Ocean. In August 1804, Clark was put in charge of the government farm at New Town, where the colony's stock had been sent. In October 1807, Clark took up residence in the main settlement at Hobart Town as storekeeper. He was still in government employment when, with J. Barnes, he printed in 1810, Tasmania's first newspaper, the Derwent Star and Van Diemen's Land Intelligencer. This was a government journal edited by George Harris. Thomas Clark was granted 100 acres (40 ha) of land, which he finally located at Campania. He was appointed superintendent of convicts once more, but resigned in 1812. Clark died in December 1828, his death not being recorded in the press.
- John Blinkworth had previously been a convict at Port Jackson. He returned to England and was now on Ocean as a free settler returning to be united with his de facto wife, Elizabeth Cummings. They were formally married in Hobart in 1804.
- Richard Pitt: Richard Pitt was born on 3 March 1765, at Tiverton, Devon, England. He married Jane Tanner, also of Tiverton, and they had four children. In 1803, Pitt boarded Ocean as a free settler, together with one daughter, Salome, and two sons, Phillip and Francis. Pitt's wife and eldest son stayed in England. Pitt was made constable in Van Diemen's Land and in December 1804, was granted 100 acres (40 ha) of land at Stainsforth's Cove (New Town). He grew wheat and barley, built up herds of sheep and pigs, and by 1809 he and his children were no longer relying on the government for support. He leased grazing land at the Green Ponds (Kempton) district, where his children also located grants. Pitt retained his farming interests, but gave increasing attention to official duties as district constable at New Town. On 14 February 1818, Pitt was appointed chief constable for Hobart Town. Pitt seized the opportunity of his new standing to ask for a free passage to the colony for his wife. Governor Macquarie sent the request to London, but Mrs Pitt declined the opportunity. Richard Pitt was one of the most respectable colonists. He remained chief constable until his death at Hobart on 14 May 1826. The three children who came with him on Ocean all settled in Van Diemen's Land.
- William and Elizabeth Cockerill migrated for green grass, together with their children William, Arabella and Ann. He became a successful farmer.
- John Hartley, his wife Hezekiah and son Joseph, migrated on Ocean as free settlers in 1803, and then at some stage travelled to Port Jackson in New South Wales. They returned to England from Port Jackson and then migrated again to Port Jackson in 1809. The family then returned to England in 1813.
- Anthony Fletcher and his wife Sarah were terribly unfortunate in that they lost two babies. One died in May 1803, while Ocean was at berth in Tenerife. Then, while Ocean was at berth in Rio de Janeiro, Sarah gave birth to a baby girl on 5 July. This little baby died at Port Phillip Heads in October 1803, just one day before arriving at Port Phillip.
- John Pascoe Fawkner' manuscript reminiscences, held in the collection of his papers in the La Trobe Library, were published for the first time to mark the centenary of his death on 4 September 1869.
- Joseph Potaski was a convict on both Ocean and Calcutta; his wife Catherine and son Joseph also came out with him as free settlers. Potaski was the first Polish Jew to arrive in Australia. Catherine gave birth to a daughter, Catherine jnr. when the Ocean berthed at Risdon Cove, thus making Catherine the first European to be born and baptised in Van Diemen's Land.
