= Leonard Fosbrook =

- Occupation: public servant
- Years active: 1803–1814
- Known for: early settler in Tasmania

Leonard Fosbrook (flourished 1803–1814) was an early settler in Tasmania, Australia.

Fosbrook was a deputy-commissary to David Collins' expedition to settle in Port Phillip, in what is now Victoria, Australia in 1803.

The settlement relocated to Hobart, Tasmania in early 1804. Fosbrook continued to serve as deputy-commissary until resigning in 1809. He was reinstated in 1810. In February 1814 he was found guilty of gross and criminal neglect of duty and fraudulent conduct, and dismissed from his post. He returned to England later in that year in the whaler Seringapatam, which was returning to England after her capture and recovery during the War of 1812.

== See also ==
- Ocean (1794 ship), the merchant ship that carried Fosbrook to Port Philip
- History of Victoria, for the 1803 British settlement of Port Phillip
