= Matthew Bowden =

Matthew Bowden (1779–1814) served as surgeon in the Royal Lancashire Regiment and assistant surgeon on David Collins' 1803 expedition to found a British settlement in Port Phillip, now part of Victoria, Australia. The settlement (and Bowden) relocated to Hobart, Tasmania in early 1804.

He died in Tasmania on 23 October 1814.

== See also ==
- Ocean (1794 ship), the merchant ship that carried Bowden to Port Philip
- History of Victoria, for the 1803 British settlement of Port Phillip
