= Richard Pitt =

Australian settler and constable

- Born: March 3, 1765; Tiverton, Devon, England
- Died: May 14, 1826 (aged 61); Hobart, Tasmania, Australia
- Occupation: constable
- Known for: early settler in Hobart

Richard Pitt (1765–1826) was an early settler and constable in Tasmania. He migrated to Australia in 1803 on Ocean, one of two ships that founded a short-lived settlement in Port Phillip. The Port Phillip settlement was abandoned in early 1804, and relocated to Hobart. Pitt was made constable in Van Diemen's Land, and in December 1804, was granted 100 acres (40 ha) of land at Stainsforth's Cove (New Town). Pitt retained his farming interests, but paid more attention to his official duties as district constable at New Town.

On 14 February 1818, Pitt was appointed chief constable for Hobart Town. He remained chief constable until his death at Hobart on 14 May 1826.
