= Daniel Woodriff =

Royal Navy officer and navigator (1756–1842)

Captain Daniel Woodriff CB
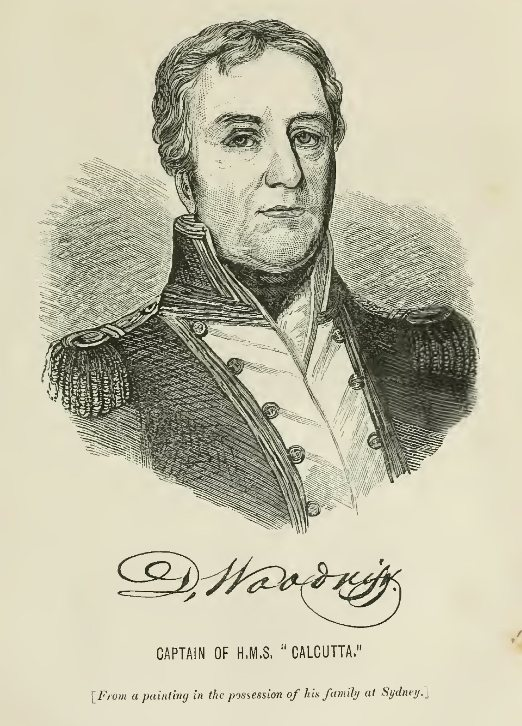
- Portrait of Woodriff
- Born: 17 November 1756; England
- Died: 25 February 1842 (aged 85); England
- Military career
- Allegiance: Great Britain; United Kingdom
- Branch: Royal Navy
- Service years: –1842
- Rank: Captain
- Commands: HMS Endymion; HMS Calcutta
- Conflicts: American War of Independence; French Revolutionary Wars; Napoleonic Wars; Action of 26 September 1805
- Awards: Companion of the Order of the Bath

Captain Daniel Woodriff CB (17 November 1756 – 25 February 1842) was a Royal Navy officer who served in the American War of Independence and French Revolutionary and Napoleonic Wars. Woodriff made two voyages to Australia; he served as the naval agent on the convict transport Kitty in 1792 and in 1803 captained HMS Calcutta as part of David Collins' expedition to found a settlement in Port Phillip.

== Early life ==
Daniel Woodriff was born on 17 November 1756 in England. He joined the Royal Navy and was commissioned as a lieutenant on 1 April 1783, and received promotion to the rank of commander on 18 September 1795, and to captain on 28 April 1802.

=== Voyage to Australia ===
Towards the end of 1802, Woodriff was appointed to command of the Calcutta, a 50-gun ship armed en flûte, and fitted to transport convicts. They were bound for Port Phillip in the Bass Strait, on the southern extremity of Australia, with the intention of setting up a settlement there under the command of David Collins. Calcutta sailed from Spithead on 28 April 1803, in company with the storeship Ocean, calling at Rio de Janeiro in July, and the Cape of Good Hope in August, arriving at their intended destination in October. Calcutta then sailed alone to Port Jackson to take on a cargo of 800 long tons (810 t) of timber. Whilst in Sydney, Woodriff and the crew of Calcutta assisted in suppressing the Castle Hill convict rebellion. For that service, Woodriff received a 1,000-acre (400 ha) land grant near Penrith, New South Wales in 1804.

Calcutta then sailed back to England via Cape Horn and Rio de Janeiro, arriving at Spithead on 23 July 1804, thereby completing a circumnavigation of the globe in ten months and three days.

=== Action of 26 September 1805 ===
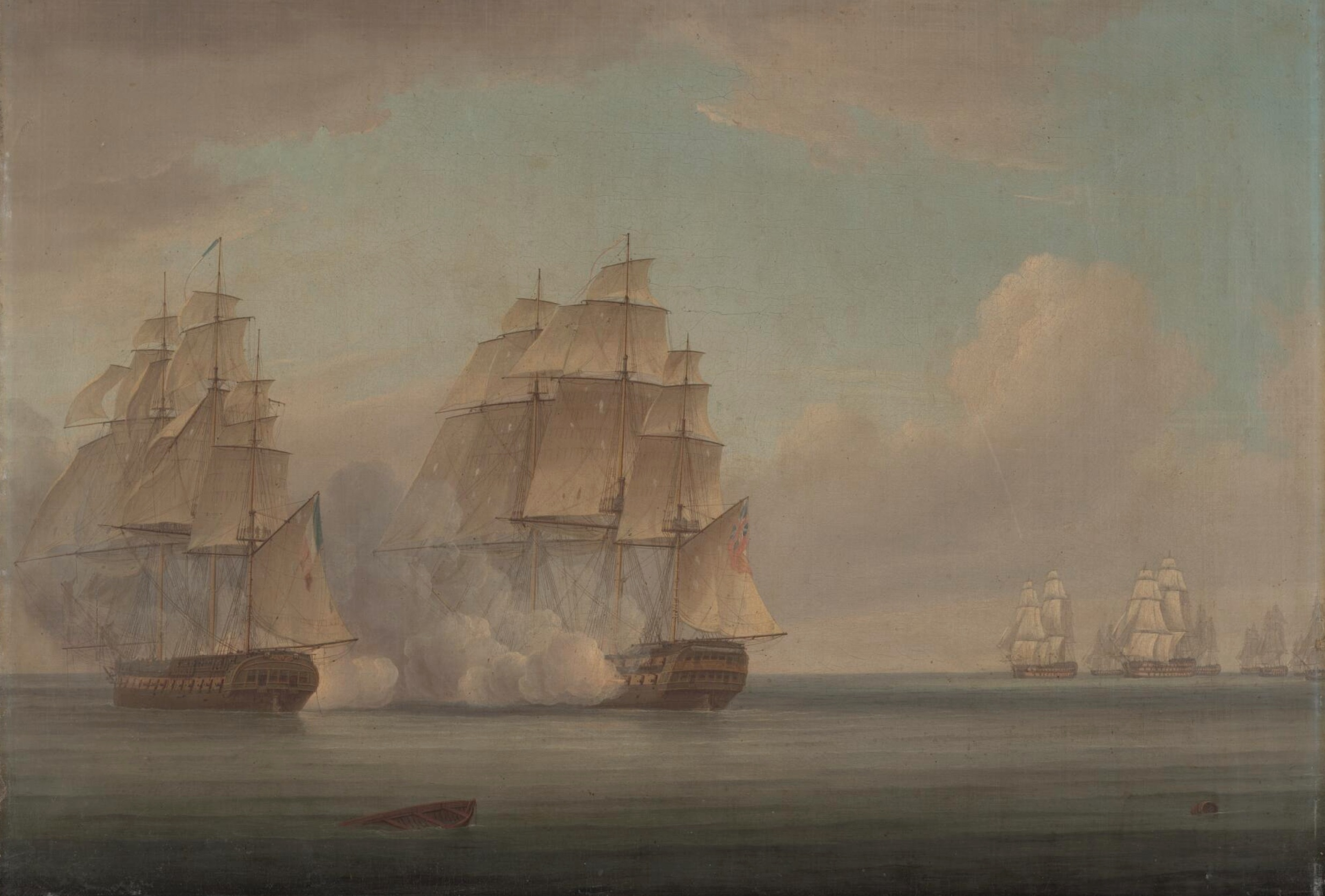
HMS Calcutta (centre) under Woodriff at the action of 26 September 1805

Calcutta was refitted as a 50-gun ship and sent to Saint Helena to escort a merchant convoy back to England. She arrived there on 3 August 1804 and sailed with six merchantmen back to England. At the action of 26 September 1805, as the convoy approached the entrance to the English Channel, they encountered a larger French squadron. Woodriff attacked, sacrificing his ship to give the convoy a chance to escape, which all but one did, while Calcutta was forced to surrender. Woodriff and his crew were landed at La Rochelle three months later, and marched to Verdun, 600 miles (970 km) away. In June 1807, Woodriff was released in a prisoner exchange and court-martialled for the loss of his ship. He was honourably acquitted, and his conduct was pronounced to have been that of "a brave, cool, and intrepid officer."

=== Later career ===
In 1808 Woodriff was appointed agent for prisoners of war at Forton, near Gosport. Towards the end of the war he served as Resident Commissioner at Jamaica. He was admitted into the Royal Hospital, Greenwich, on 9 November 1830, and was appointed a Companion of the Order of the Bath on 26 September 1831, on the occasion of William IV's Coronation Honours.

== Family ==
He was born on 17 December 1756, the son of John Woodriff of Deptford, Kent.

He married Asia Sumarel (1764–1827); they had three daughters, and three sons: Capt. Daniel James Woodriff RN (1787–1860), Cdr. John Robert Woodriff RN (1790–1868), and Lt. Robert Mathews Woodriff RN (1792–1820).
