= HMS Calcutta (1795) =

Ship of the line of the Royal Navy

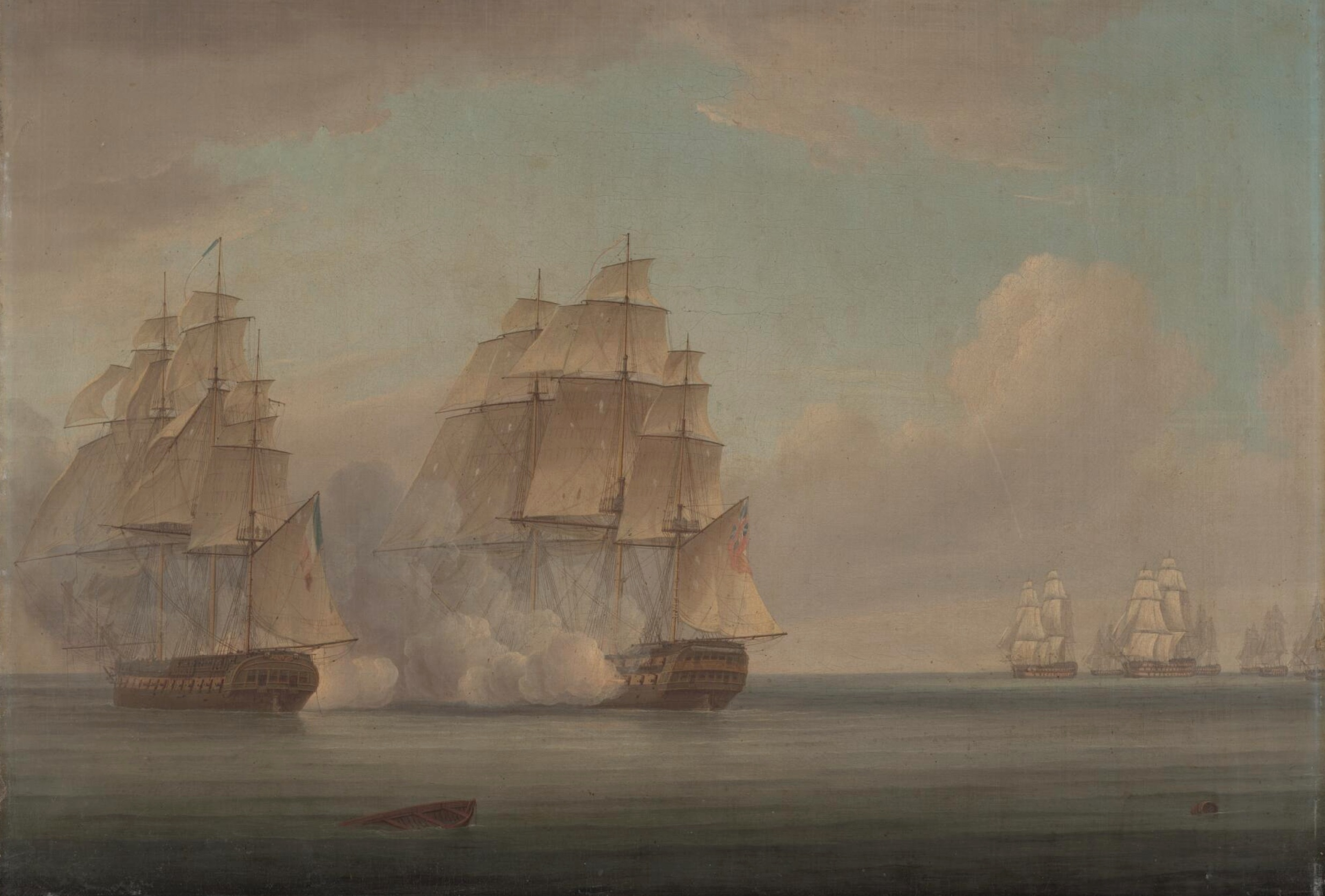
- Calcutta (centre) at the action of 26 September 1805

History

East India CompanyGreat Britain
- Name: Warley
- Builder: Perry & Co., Blackwall
- Launched: 16 October 1788
- Fate: Sold to the Royal Navy in 1795

Great Britain
- Name: HMS Calcutta
- Acquired: 9 March 1795
- Commissioned: May 1795
- Fate: Captured by the French Navy, 26 September 1805

France
- Name: Calcutta
- Captured: 26 September 1805
- Fate: Destroyed by fire on 12 April 1809 at the Battle of the Basque Roads

General characteristics
- Type: Mercantile: East Indiaman; Royal Navy: 56-gun fourth rate
- Tons burthen: 1,175, or 1,17573/94 (bm)
- Length: 156 ft 11 in (47.8 m) (overall); 129 ft 7 3/4 in (39.5 m) (keel)
- Beam: 41 ft 3 1/2 in (12.6 m)
- Draught: 17 ft 2 in (5.2 m)
- Complement: East Indiaman: 125; Royal Navy: 324; 160 as storeship
- Armament: East Indiaman: 26 × 9-pounder guns; Royal Navy: Lower deck: 28 × 18-pounder guns; Upper deck: 26 × 32-pounder cannonades + 2 × 9-pounder guns

HMS Calcutta was a 56-gun fourth-rate ship of the line of the Royal Navy. She was launched at Blackwall Yard in 1788 as the East Indiaman Warley, and made two trading voyages to the East Indies for the East India Company between 1789 and 1795. In 1795, the Royal Navy purchased her and renamed her Calcutta, designating the ship as a convoy escort. She also transported convicts to Australia in a voyage that became a circumnavigation of the world. In 1805, the 74-gun ship of the line Magnanime captured her, and the French Navy took the captured ship into service under her existing name. In 1809, Calcutta ran aground during the Battle of the Basque Roads, with her crew abandoning ship before a British boarding party burned the empty vessel.

== East Indiaman ==
The East Indiaman Warley was built at John Perry's Blackwall Yard in 1788, the first vessel of the name that Perry built for the East India Company. (Note: The second Warley, also an East Indiaman, was larger and was built in 1795 at the same yard as her predecessor. Her captain for her first five voyages was Henry Wilson. While under his command on her fourth voyage, Warley participated in Nathaniel Dance's victory at the Battle of Pulo Aura.) She made two trading voyages to the East Indies for the East India Company. Warley's captain for her two voyages was Henry Wilson. He received a letter of marque on 7 September 1793.

=== First EIC voyage (1789–90) ===
Captain Henry Wilson sailed from Falmouth on 8 March 1789, bound for Madras and China. Warley reached Madras on 22 June, left on 9 August, and arrived at Whampoa on 28 September. Homeward bound, she crossed the Second Bar on 11 February 1790, reached St Helena on 28 April, and arrived at the Downs on 23 June.

=== Second EIC voyage (1793–94) ===
Captain Henry Wilson sailed from the Downs on 19 January 1793, again bound for Madras and China. Warley reached the Cape of Good Hope on 3 April, and arrived at Madras on 30 May.

By 6 July 1793, Warley was off Pondicherry with Admiral Cornwallis's squadron. Warley, Triton, and Royal Charlotte, together with HMS Minerva, participated in the capture of Pondicherry by maintaining a blockade of the port. By 28 August 1793, Warley was back at Madras. The Indiamen then sailed for China in early September.

By 4 October 1793, the East Indiamen were at Penang, and two weeks later at Malacca. On their way to China, the East Indiamen participated in an action in the Straits of Malacca. They came upon a French frigate, with some six or seven of her prizes, replenishing her water casks ashore. The three British vessels immediately gave chase. The frigate fled towards the Sunda Strait. The Indiamen were able to catch up with a number of the prizes, and after a few cannon shots, were able to retake them. The British restored the prizes to their crews and took the French prize crews as prisoners of war. Had they not carried letters of marque, such behaviour might well have qualified as piracy.

Warley arrived at Whampoa on 13 December. When Warley was at Whampoa that December she joined other East Indiamen there, among which were several that on their return to Britain the Admiralty would purchase: Royal Charlotte, Ceres, Earl of Abergavenny, and Hindostan. The British Government had chartered Hindostan to take Lord Macartney to China in an unsuccessful attempt to open diplomatic and commercial relations with China. Homeward bound, Warley crossed the Second Bar on 13 March 1794. She reached St Helena on 18 June, and arrived at the Downs on 7 September.

== Cruiser and armed transport ==
In early 1795, the Royal Navy purchased Warley and had her original builders, Perry & Co., refit her as a 56-gun fourth-rate, under the name Calcutta, at a cost of £10,300. She was one of nine large merchantmen that the Navy Board purchased that year for conversion to convoy escorts.

Captain William Bligh was her first commander, assigned to her to supervise her conversion. He took command on 16 April 1795 and commissioned her in May. In October 1795, the crew of the 74-gun HMS Defiance (then commanded by Captain Sir George Horne) mutinied. Bligh, in Calcutta, was ordered to embark 200 troops and take them alongside Defiance so that they might board her and regain control. The threat of the soldiers ended the mutiny for the time being, though the crew of the Defiance mutinied again in 1797 and 1798. Bligh continued to command Calcutta until she was paid off in February 1796 and transferred to the Transport Board.

In order for her to fulfill her new role, the Transport Board had the guns on her lower deck removed. As a result she no longer needed as large a crew and her complement fell to 160 officers and men. Calcutta served in the transport role under Lieutenants Robert Arnold (June 1796 – August 1797), Edward Jekyll Canes (August 1797 – January 1798), Richard Pouldon (or Poulden, or Polden; January 1798 – December 1799). and John Anderson (December 1799 – May 1802).

Under Poulden Calcutta was at the capture of Menorca in December 1798. On 11 November she was part of a squadron that unsuccessfully chased four Spanish frigates, though two days later Argo recaptured the sloop Peterel, which the Spaniards had captured on the 11th.

Lieutenant John Anderson (December 1799 – May 1802) replaced Pouldon. On 6 June 1800 he sailed Calcutta to Gibraltar, carrying the Banffshire Fencibles.

=== Convict transport ===
Between May 1802 and February 1803, the Navy had Calcutta fitted out as a transport for convicts being sent to Britain's penal colonies in Australia. She received new armament in the form of sixteen 24-pounder carronades on her upper deck and two six-pounder guns on the forecastle. Captain Daniel Woodriff recommissioned her in November 1802 and sailed her from Spithead on 28 April 1803, accompanied by Ocean, to establish a settlement at Port Phillip. Calcutta carried a crew of 150 and 307 male convicts, along with civil officers, marines, and some 30 wives and children of the convicts. The Reverend Robert Knopwood kept a journal on the voyage.

Calcutta arrived at Teneriffe on 13 May; five convicts had died on that leg, suggesting that many had probably been embarked already in bad health. She reached Rio de Janeiro on 19 July, and the Dutch colony at the Cape of Good Hope on 16 August.

While Calcutta was at the Cape, a vessel arrived with news that Britain was now at war with the Batavian Republic. The colony's Dutch commodore sent a representative aboard Calcutta to demand her surrender and that of her contents. While the representative waited, Woodriff spent two hours preparing her for battle. He then showed the representative her sailors and marines at their guns, and told the Dutchman to inform the commodore that "if he wants this ship he must come and take her if he can". To speed up the preparations, William Gammon, the master's mate, had asked the convicts if any would volunteer to fight and work the ship. All volunteered. The commodore gave Woodriff 24 hours to leave, saying that he "did not wish to capture such a large number of thieves".

On 12 October, she reached her destination; by this time another three convicts had died. Of the eight convicts that died, one had drowned in an escape attempt at the Cape.

At Port Phillip David Collins, the commander of the expedition, found that the poor soil and shortage of fresh water made the area unsuitable for a colony. Collins wanted to move the colony to the Derwent River on the south coast of Tasmania (then Van Diemens Land) to the site of current-day Hobart. Woodriff refused the use of Calcutta, arguing that Ocean was large enough to transport the colony, and that he was under orders to pick up naval supplies for transport to England.

In December Woodriff sailed to Sydney where he took on a cargo of lumber. At midnight on 4 March, Woodriff landed 150 of his crew and marines to assist the New South Wales Corps and the Loyal Association, a local militia, in suppressing a convict uprising in support of the Castle Hill convict rebellion, a revolt by some 260 Irish convicts against Governor King. Afterward, the commander of the marine detachment on Calcutta, Charles Menzies, offered his services to the governor as superintendent of a new settlement at Coal Harbour, an offer Governor King accepted. Another Calcutta officer, Lieut. John Houston, accepted an appointment as acting Lieutenant Governor of Norfolk Island while Major Joseph Foveaux was on leave.

Calcutta left on 17 March 1804, doubled Cape Horn and reached Rio on 22 May. In reaching Rio, she had thus circumnavigated the world in ten months three days. She arrived at Spithead on 23 July.

== Ship of the line ==
In September 1804, the Admiralty again fitted out Calcutta for duty as a cruiser, re-arming her as a 56-gun fourth rate.

=== Capture ===
On 3 August 1805, Calcutta, still under the command of Captain Woodriff, left Saint Helena as escort of a motley convoy to England. The convoy consisted of the East India company's "extra-ship" Indus, from Madras, the southern whaler African from Desolation, the whaler Fox from the Mozambique channel, the whaler Grand Sachem from the Peruvian coast and bound to Milford, the Prussian ship Wilhelmina (or Anna Wilhelmina), which Calcutta had detained on her way out to Saint Helena, and the large Swedish ship Carolina, which was sailing from China and asked to join.

On 14 September 1805, the brig Brothers, of London, from Tobago, joined the convoy. She had gotten separated from her convoy in a gale. Unfortunately, she was leaky and a very slow sailer. On 25 September 1805, the convoy was in the Channel south of the Isles of Scilly when lookouts spotted a number of unknown vessels in the distance. Calcutta moved to position herself between the convoy and the unknown flotilla.

Next morning, it became clear that the unknown vessels were probably French so Calcutta signalled the convoy to make sail without her and moved to intercept the French vessels. She sailed towards the nearest vessel, which turned out to be the 40-gun frigate Armide. The engagement was desultory but Calcutta succeeded in luring the French southward and away from the convoy. As a result, the French detached the brig Sylph which captured only the slow-sailing Brothers.

However, eventually the rest of the French squadron started to arrive. It turned out to be Allemand's squadron, which included the 74-gun Magnanime. Woodriff brought Calcutta alongside Magnanime, but after a battle of some three-quarters of an hour was forced to strike. The French had shot high, bringing down Calcutta's rigging, disabling her. Because the French fired high, Calcutta suffered only six dead and six wounded out of a crew of 350. The French brought Calcutta into French service the next day and retained her name.

Woodriff was imprisoned at Verdun and appealed to the French foreign minister, Talleyrand, for release. Eventually, in early 1807, he was sent to Saint-Malo, where the French government provided him a vessel under cartel to take him to England. The British government immediately reciprocated by releasing a French officer of equal rank. The court-martial on Gladiator, on 1 January 1808, acquitted Woodriff and his officers, praising the captain for his gallantry and skillful maneuvering, which had allowed the convoy to escape.

The owners and underwriters on the ship and cargo of the Indus, one of the East Indiamen that Calcutta had saved, proposed a subscription of 21 per cent on the amount insured. The resulting money was to be presented to Woodriffe, his officers and the crew, as a small token of gratitude.

=== French service ===
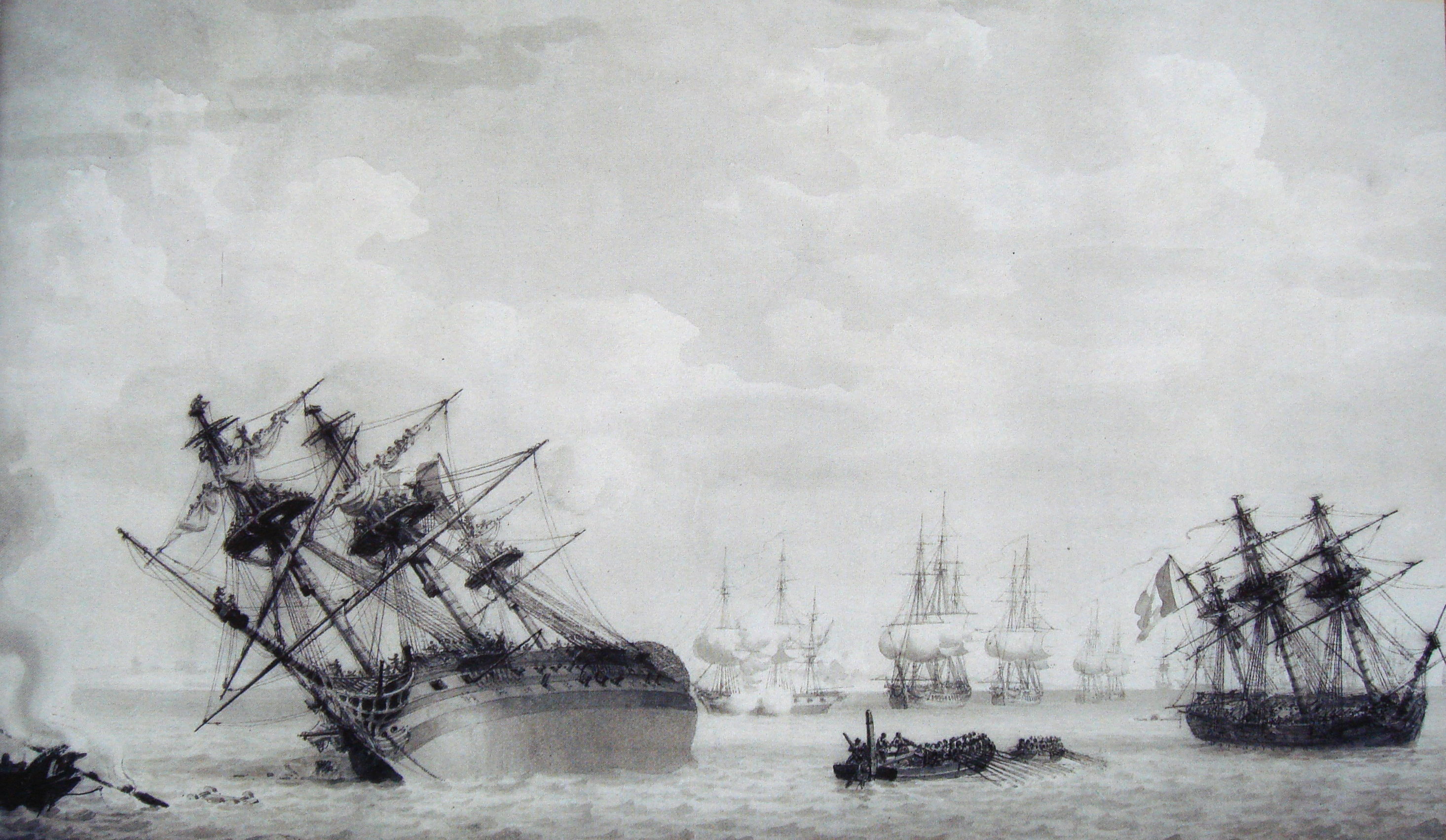
Calcutta (first from right) at the Battle of the Basque Roads

In 1809, Calcutta was part of the French fleet in La Rochelle under Ship-of-the-line Captain Jean-Baptiste Lafon. During the Battle of the Basque Roads, Calcutta ran aground on the shoals of Les Palles on 12 April, as did most of the French fleet. Under fire from HMS Imperieuse, Calcutta's crew panicked and abandoned ship without orders. A small boarding party from Imperieuse captured Calcutta and set the ship on fire to prevent her re-capture, causing her to explode. Following the battle, a court-martial held Lafon responsible for the loss of his ship, and deemed his behaviour to have been cowardly. In a five to four vote, the court sentenced Lafon to death; a firing squad executed him on the deck of Océan on 9 September.

== Other information ==
The National Library of Australia has three oil paintings by Thomas Whitcombe of the battle between Calcutta and Magnanime and Armide.

== See also ==
- List of ships captured in the 19th century
