= List of sail frigates of France =

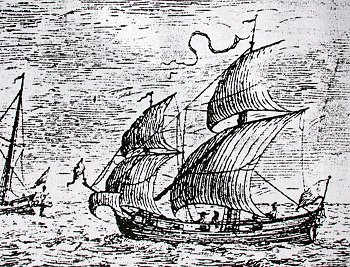
Rieuse, a 26-gun oar-assisted frégate légère (1674–1698).

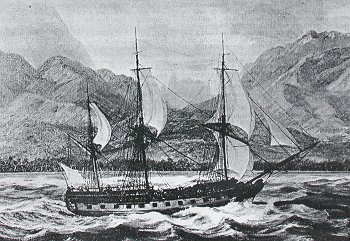
Boudeuse, of Louis Antoine de Bougainville.

This article is a list of French naval frigates during the Age of Sail, from the middle of the 17th century (when the type emerged) until the close of the sailing era in the middle of the 19th century. The tables excludes privateer frigates (i.e. those owned by individuals or business enterprises), which were not part of the Marine Royale, as well as frigates built for the French East India Company (Compagnie des Indes) unless the latter were subsequently acquired by the French Navy.

Note that throughout this article the term "-pounder" refers to French pre-metric units of weight - livres - which were almost 8% greater than UK/US units of the same name; every other maritime power likewise established its own system of weights and each country's 'pound' was different from that of every other nation. Similarly French pre-metric units of length (pieds and pouces) were 6.575% longer than equivalent UK/US units of measurement (feet and inches); the pre-metric French pied ("foot") was equivalent to 324.8394 mm, whereas the UK/US foot equalled 304.8 mm. These differences should be taken into account in any calculations based on the units given below.

== Classification of frigates ==
Early French naval frigates, until the 1740s, comprises two distinct groups. The larger types were the frégates-vaisseau, with batteries of guns spread over two decks; these were subdivided into two groups; the larger were the frégates du premier ordre - or vaisseau du quatrième rang (French Fourth Rates) - usually with a lower deck battery of 12-pounder guns, and an upper deck battery of either 8-pounder or 6-pounder guns; and the smaller were the frégates du deuxième ordre - or vaisseau du cinquième rang (French Fifth Rates) - with a lower deck batter of 8-pounder guns, and an upper deck battery of either 6-pounder or 4-pounder guns. The smaller types were the frégates légères, with a single battery of (usually) 6-pounder or 4-pounder guns, plus a few small guns on its superstructure or gaillards. The 'modern' sail frigate, with its main battery on the upper deck, and no ports along the lower deck, emerged at the start of the 1740s.

This article categorises frigates according to the weight of the projectile fired by the main battery; the first 'true' frigates in the 1740s carried either 6-pounder or 8-pounder guns, but development soon standardised around the 12-pounder frigate, carrying thirteen pairs (occasionally fourteen pairs) of 12-pounder guns on the upper deck, and usually three pairs of 6-pounder guns on the quarterdeck and forecastle (collectively referred to as the "gaillards" in French). During the American Revolutionary War, larger types carrying an 18-pounder or even 24-pounder main battery (and more secondary guns on the gaillards) were introduced, and following the French Revolution these became predominant. Finally in the 1820s, a new type of 30-pounder armed frigate was brought into service.

== Design and construction ==
In general, French frigates were more lightly built than their British equivalents. This reflected not a poorer quality of design (French designs were often highly prized by the Royal Navy, which copied the designs of a number of the French frigates that they captured, and built a quantity of vessels to the same designs, but with heavier scantlings), but resulted from a different strategic need. French frigates were perceived as being away from port for limited periods; they had less room for storage of provisions for protracted overseas deployments, and they sacrificed durability for speed and ease of handling. British frigates, in comparison, were more solidly built to endure lengthy times at sea (in particular, to remain for several months on blockade service off enemy harbours) and thus were more able to withstand extreme weather conditions, but were slow in comparison.

The number of guns is as rated; from the 1780s, many carried some obusiers (from 1800, carronades) or swivels also.

== Frigates of Louis XIV (1643–1715) ==
This table commences with a listing of early French naval frigates of the second half of the 17th century and the early 18th century (under the reign of Louis XIV – the "Sun King" – from 14 May 1643 to 1 September 1715). Note that numerous French warships underwent changes of names on 24 June 1671, with many other changes of names on various occasions.

Under the classification system introduced by Colbert in 1669, as altered in 1671, the "quatrième rang" (fourth rank) covered two-decked frigates (generally carrying a main battery of 12-pounder guns) of between 36 and 46 guns, amended in 1683 to between 40 and 46 guns, while the "cinquième rang" (fifth rank) comprised smaller frigates, both single-decked and two-decked (generally carrying a main battery of 8-pounder guns) of between 28 and 34 guns, increased in 1683 to between 30 and 36 guns. Below this rank were the unranked frégates légères ("light frigates") carrying fewer guns.

=== Frigates of the 1st Order (or 4th Rank Vessels) ===
These were two-decked ships, usually carrying 12-pounder guns in their lower deck battery, and generally an upper deck battery of 6-pounders (although there were exceptions to these calibres). They were classed as fourth rank vessels (vaisseaux du quatrième rang). While not rated as ships of the line, inevitably several of these frigates not infrequently found themselves taking a place in the line of battle, although their main function was for cruising and for trade protection/attack.

- Sainte Anne, 30 guns, acquired 1651 – broken up 1654.
- Françoise, 36 guns, design by Tanguy, launched late 1656 at Saint-Malo – renamed Éole in June 1671; broken up 1674.
- Victoire, 30/38 guns, design by Jean-Pierre Brun, launched 18 June 1658 at Soubise – captured by the British Navy off Lisbon in April 1666, becoming HMS French Victory.
- Fleur de Lys, 30 guns, design by Georges Carteret, launched 1659 at Brest – wrecked January 1662.
- Notre-Dame, 28/36 guns, launched 1658 at Nice and purchased 1661 for the Navy – deleted 1675.
- Infante, 36 guns, launched June 1661 at Brest – renamed Ecueil in June 1671; wrecked off Puerto Rico 25 February 1673.
- Jules, 40 guns, design by Gédéon Rodolphe, launched 1661 at Toulon – renamed Indien in June 1671; wrecked May 1673.
- Mancini class, designed by Gédéon Rodolphe with 2 × 20-pounder, 6 × 16-pounder, 10 × 12-pounder and 14 × 8-pounder guns:
  - Beaufort, (ex-Mancini) 36 guns, launched 15 May 1662 at Toulon – renamed Neptune in June 1671, then Maure in January 1679; deleted 1686.
  - Mercoeur, 36 guns, launched June 1662 at Toulon – renamed Trident in June 1671; deleted 1686.
- Duc, 42/44 guns, design by Laurent Hubac, launched 1665 at Brest – renamed Comte in June 1671, wrecked in December 1676.
- Sirène, (ex-Monarque) 44/46 guns, design by François Pomet, launched June 1666 at Toulon – wrecked off Formentera in January 1684.
- Cheval Marin, (ex-Prince) 44/46 guns, design by Laurent Coulomb, launched June 1666 at Toulon – hulked 1726, taken to pieces 1729.
- Saint Charles, 34/42 guns, purchased on the stocks and launched August 1666 – wrecked January 1670 en route to Canada.
- Tigre, 40/44 guns, design by Jean Guichard, launched November 1666 at Soubise – hulked June 1689, taken to pieces September 1697.
- Flamand, 34/40 guns, design by Hendrick, launched 1667 at Dunkirk – renamed Arc en Ciel in June 1671, captured by the Dutch November 1673.
- Dunkerquois, 40/46 guns, launched early 1667 at Dunkirk – renamed Brusque in June 1671, hulked in February 1688.
- Provençal class, designed by Gédéon Rodolphe:
  - Toulon, 44/52 guns, launched February 1667 at Toulon – renamed Joli in June 1671, then Fidele in June 1678 – hulked 1695.
  - Provençal, 46/52 guns, launched March 1667 at Toulon – renamed Mignon in June 1671, then Capable in June 1678 – deleted 1690.
- Galant, 44/46 guns, design by Laurent Hubac, launched early 1668 at Brest – taken to pieces 1689.
- Le Havre, 44 guns, design by Jean Esnault, launched August 1669 at Le Havre – renamed Alcyon in June 1671, condemned 1686.
- Saint Antoine de Genes, 34/40 guns, former Portuguese San Antonio du Marquis de Centurion launched 13 June 1765, purchased at Lisbon for the Navy in November 1669 – renamed Leger in June 1671; condemned 1678 and taken to pieces in 1679.
- Assuré class, designed by Hendrick with 20 × 12-pounder, 20 × 8-pounder and 6 × 4-pounder guns:
  - Assuré, 44/48 guns, launched December 1670 at Dunkirk – renamed Français in June 1671; taken to pieces in September 1686.
  - Constant, 44/48 guns, launched December 1670 at Dunkirk – renamed Oiseau in June 1671; sold December 1693 to take to pieces.
- Basque, 36/44 guns, design by Joseph Saboulin, launched 1 January 1671 at Bayonne – renamed Brillant in June 1671, then Triton in June 1678; deleted 1694.
- Aventurier class, designed by Louis Audibert:
  - Aventurier, (ex-Galante) 36/40 guns, launched November 1671 at Marseille – deleted 1697.
  - Bizarre, (ex-Mignonne) 42/44 guns, launched 29 August 1672 at Marseille – deleted 1694 and sold for commerce.
- Marquis, (ex-Attendant) 46 guns, design by Laurent Hubac, launched March 1673 at Brest – sunk in action against the Dutch off Tobago in March 1677.
- Actif, 36/40 guns, design by Pierre Malet, launched September 1673 at Rochefort – renamed Etoile in December 1675; deleted 1696.
- Éole, (ex-Changeant) 44 guns, design by François Chapelle, launched October 1674 at Toulon – renamed Arche de Noë in February 1692, then Cache in 1693 and deleted same year.
- Facheux class, designed by Hendrick with 10 × 12-pounder, 8 × 8-pounder, 16 × 6-pounder and 6 × 4-pounder guns:
  - Facheux, 40 guns, launched November 1673 at Dunkirk – renamed Entendu in January 1675; burnt (as a fireship) in February 1675.
  - Brutal, 40 guns, launched November 1673 at Dunkirk – renamed Croissant in January 1675; taken to pieces 1692.
- Indien, (ex-Anonyme) 40–44 guns, design by Laurent Coulomb, launched 21 November 1673 at Toulon – deleted as frigate 1691, but probably used as a flûte and renamed Concorde in April 1692.
- Hasardeux class, designed by Honoré Malet, with 18 × 12-pounder, 18 × 6-pounder and 4 × 4-pounder guns:
  - Hasardeux, 38–44 guns, launched 1674 at Rochefort – wrecked April 1695 at St Domingo.
  - Faucon, (ex-Inconnu) 40–44 guns, launched 1674 at Rochefort – renamed Faucon Français from 1694 until 1703; taken to pieces 1708.
- Entendu, (ex-privateer Dauphin) 40–42 guns, launched 1665 at Saint-Malo and purchased for the Navy in February 1675 – sold 1692.
- Comte, (ex-Fidele) 40–44 guns, design by Pierre Le Brun, launched November 1677 at Brest – deleted 1698.
- Ferme class, designed by François Chapelle, with 20 × 12-pounder, 20 × 6-pounder and 4 × 4-pounder guns:
  - Ferme, 40–46 guns, launched 29 January 1678 at Toulon – renamed Laurier in June 1678; sold April 1692.
  - Arc en Ciel, 40–46 guns, launched 31 March 1678 at Toulon – deleted 1698.
- Ecueil, 40–44 guns, design by Etienne Salicon, launched 2 November 1678 at Le Havre – sold 1689.
- Leger, 40 guns, design by Etienne Salicon, launched 3 November 1679 at Le Havre – condemned 1695.
- Solide class, designed by F. Hendrick with 20 × 12-pounder, 20 × 6-pounder and 4 × 4-pounder guns:
  - Solide, (ex-Railleuse) 44 guns, launched 6 November 1683 at Dunkirk – wrecked August 1694 off Tortuga.
  - Emporté, (ex-Trompeuse) 44 guns, launched 20 November 1683 at Dunkirk – condemned August 1705 and abandoned.
- Gaillard, 44–48 guns, design by Etienne Salicon, launched 17 November 1684 at Le Havre – sold September 1689.
- François, 48–52 guns, design by Etienne Salicon, launched 20 October 1687 at Le Havre – taken to pieces 1736.
- Trident, 50 guns, design by Laurent Coulomb, launched 22 June 1688 at Toulon – captured by the English Navy in January 1695, added to the RN under the same name.
- Alcyon, 40 guns, design by Howens Hendrick, launched July 1689 at Dunkirk – broken up 1718.
- Adroit, 44 guns, design by Etienne Salicon, launched 20 January 1691 at Le Havre – burnt off Orkney June 1703.
- Opiniâtre class, designed by Honoré Malet with 20 × 12-pounder and 20 × 6-pounder guns:
  - Opiniâtre, 40 guns, launched July 1691 at Rochefort – deleted 1699.
  - Poli, 40 (later 36) guns, launched August 1691 at Rochefort – broken up 1717.
- Mutine, 40 guns, design by François Le Brun, launched 28 May 1695 at Brest – deleted 1708.
- Volontaire, 44 (launched late August 1695 at Toulon) – reduced to 36 guns in 1701; captured and wrecked in the Battle of Vigo Bay in October 1702.
- Amphitrite, 42/44 guns, design by Pierre Masson, launched 1696 at Rochefort) – sold 1698 commercially but restored to Navy 1704; burnt by accident 1713.
- Avenant, 42 guns, design by Blaise Pangalo, launched September 1696 at Brest – burnt by accident 1704.
- Dauphine, 40/42 guns, design by Pierre Chaillé, launched 9 January 1697 at Le Havre – burnt in the Battle of Vigo Bay in October 1702.
- Triton, 44 guns, design by Blaise Pangalo, launched January 1697 at Brest – captured by the English Navy in the Battle of Vigo Bay in October 1702.
- Thétis, 44 guns, design by Honoré Malet, launched 1697 at Rochefort – captured by the English Navy in February 1705.
- Renommée, 48 guns, design by Antoine Tassy, launched early 1698 at Bayonne – deleted 1723.
- Maurepas, (ex-Hasardeux) 46 guns, design by François Brun, launched October 1698 at Lorient, given to the Compagnie des Indes 1698, recovered 1703 but transferred again 1705.
- Adélaïde, 44 (later 36) guns, design by François Coulomb, launched 10 January 1699 at Toulon – wrecked October 1714 off Havana.
- Indien, 44 guns, launched ?1698 for French South Sea Company, purchased 1701 for the Navy – deleted 1719.
- Africain, 44 (later 42) guns, design for Félix Arnaud, launched 1692 for French South Sea Company, purchased 1701 for the Navy – deleted 1723.
- Héros, 46 (later 50) guns, design by Pierre Coulomb, launched 24 November 1700 for French East India Company, and purchased June 1702 for the Navy – re-rated as 3ième Rang in 1705–08; deleted 1740.
- Dryade, 46 (later 44) guns, design by Philippe Cochois, launched 21 October 1702 at Le Havre – captured by the British Navy in October 1709.
- Sylvie class, designed by François Coulomb with 22 × 12-pounder, 16 × 6-pounder and 2 × 4-pounder guns:
  - Sylvie, 40 guns, purchased on the stocks for the Navy and launched 30 November 1703 at Toulon – sold 1706.
  - Parfaite, 40 guns, launched 29 September 1704 at Toulon – wrecked November 1718 off Cyprus.
- Griffon, 44 (later 50) guns, design by Blaiss Coulomb, launched 10 January 1705 at Lorient – captured by the British Navy in August 1712, but returned 1713; deleted 1744 and taken to pieces 1748.
- Vestale, launched privately, then purchased 1706 at Toulon – deleted 1757.
- Thétis, 44 guns, design by Blaise Pangalo, launched 20 June 1705 at Brest – captured by the British Navy in May 1711.
- Atalante class, designed by Philippe Cochois with 12 × 12-pounder, 18 × 8-pounder, 10 × 6-pounder and 4 × 4-pounder guns:
  - Atalante, 44 guns, launched February 1707 at Le Havre – hulked 1728, taken to pieces 1733.
  - Diane, 44 guns, launched February 1707 at Le Havre – deleted 1712.
- Amazone, 40 (later 42) guns, design by Blaise Pangalo, launched 16 April 1707 at Brest – hulked 1741, broken up 1748.
- Gloire, 38 guns, design by Laurent Hélie, launched 18 April 1707 at Lorient – captured by the British Navy in 1709, became HMS Sweepstakes; broken up 1716.
- Argonaute, 42 (later 50) guns, design by Blaise Pangalo, launched 14 November 1708 at Brest – hulked 1720, taken to pieces 1746.

Enemy frigates or equivalent captured by the French Navy 1675–1705 and classed as Frégates du Premier Ordre.

- Notre Dame du Peuple, 40/44 guns (Spanish Nuestra Señora del Pueblo captured February 1675) – retaken by the Spanish January 1676.
- Triomphant, 40 guns (Dutch Triomfantelijk captured December 1688) – deleted 1689.
- Charles II, 40 guns (Spanish Carlos II captured 1691) – deleted 1694.
- Gerzé (or Jersey), 46 (later 40) guns (English Jersey captured December 1691) – sold 1717.
- Marie-Elisabeth, 48 guns (Dutch Maria-Elizabeth captured August 1692) – sold 1697.
- Faucon Anglais, 48 guns (English Falcon captured May 1694) – deleted 1698.
- Non Such, 37/42 guns (English Nonsuch captured January 1695) – renamed Sans Pareil in 1696, deleted 1697.
- Sainte Croix, 40 guns (Spanish Santa Cruz captured 1696) – deleted 1699.
- Christo, 44 guns (Spanish galleon Santo Christo de Maracaibo captured January 1697) – captured by the Dutch in June 1697 [Apparently sold back to Spain by the Dutch, she was captured by the English Navy at Vigo in October 1702 and renamed Monmouth's Prize].
- Rotterdam, 40 guns (Dutch Rotterdam captured May 1703) – deleted 1706.
- Coventry, 50 guns (English Coventry captured August 1704) – retaken by the British Navy in May 1709.
- Falmouth, 50/52 guns (English Falmouth captured August 1704) – sold by January 1706.
- Mercure, 40/42 guns (Dutch Mercurius captured 1705) – captured January 1707 by the English Navy.

=== Frigates of the 2nd Order (or 5th Rank vessels) ===
These generally carried 8-pounder guns in their lower deck battery, and were classed as fifth rank vessels (vaisseaux du cinquième rang). Note this list is incomplete, and requires expansion.

- Saint-Sébastien, 30 guns, design by Laurent Hubac, launched 1658 at Brest for Nicolas Fouquet, seized for French Navy in September 1661 – renamed Faucon in June 1671; wrecked 1673 off Terceira. On 24 May 1665, two regimental transport ships, Saint-Sébastien and La Justice, each carrying four infantry companies of the Carignan-Salières Regiment, departed La Rochelle bound for the mouth of the Saint Lawrence River and Quebec. Aboard the Saint Sébastien were Jean Talon, newly appointed intendant of New France, and Daniel de Remy de Courcelles, the new governor of the colony who would serve under Alexandre de Prouville, Marquis de Tracy.
- Ecureuil, 38 guns, design by Laurent Hubac, launched 1660 at Concarneau for Nicholas Fouquet, seized for French Navy in September 1661 – renamed Orage in June 1671, then Eclair in December 1675, converted to fireship and burnt June 1676.
- Terron, (ex-Saint André), 24 guns, purchased February 1662, possibly ex-Swedish – sold September 1665 to French East India Company.
- Hirondelle, 30 guns, design by Hendrick?, launched 7 November 1664 at Dunkirk – deleted 1679.
- Hermine, 34 guns, design by Hendrick, launched 19 November 1664 at Dunkirk – renamed Capricieux on 24 June 1671; hulked 1680, deleted 1686.
- Saint Joseph, 34 guns, design by Laurent Coulomb, launched privately 1664 at La Ciotat and purchased in February 1666 for the Navy – renamed Dur in June 1671, then Poli in June 1678; deleted 1691 and sold 1692.
- Ville de Rouen, 34 guns, launched 1662 at Brest and purchased in April 1666 for the Navy – renamed Hasardeux in June 1671, converted to fireship and expended 1673.
- Vierge, 30 guns, former French East Indiaman Vierge du Port purchased in April 1666 for the Navy – renamed Profond in June 1671; reclassed as a flûte 1669 and deleted 1678.
- Tourbillon class, designed by Laurent Hubac, with 20 × 8-pounder and 8 × 4-pounder guns:
  - Laurier, 28 guns, launched 29 April 1670 at Brest – deleted 1677.
  - Tourbillon, 28 guns, launched 28 May 1670 at Brest – renamed Petillant on 28 June 1678; fireship 1693; deleted 1696.
- Trompeuse class, designed by Gédéon Rodolphe, probably with similar armament to Tourbillon class:
  - Bouffonne, 28 guns, launched 29 June 1670 at Toulon – renamed Drole on 24 June 1671, then Gaillard on 28 June 1678; wrecked off Le Havre 1682.
  - Trompeuse, 28 guns, launched 6 July 1670 at Toulon – renamed Triton on 24 June 1671, then Mercure on 28 June 1678; converted to flûte and renamed Econome 1692; deleted 1694.
- Jeux, 28 guns, design by Jean Guichard, launched 25 July 1670 at Rochefort – sold 1681.
- Dur, 24 guns, design by Hendrick, launched February 1671 at Dunkirk – renamed Éveillé in June 1671, then Bien Aimée in 1685 when reclassed as frégate légère; deleted 1693.
- Arrogant class, designed by Laurent Hubac, probably with similar armament to Tourbillon class:
  - Victoire, 28 guns, launched 1671 at Brest – renamed Arrogant on 24 June 1671; expended as fireship at Texel on 21 August 1673.
  - Périlleux, 28 guns, launched March 1671 at Brest – renamed Hardi on 24 June 1671, then Joly on 28 June 1678; wrecked 1692.
- Entreprenant, 32 guns, design by Jean Guichard, launched May 1672 at Rochefort; renamed Vigilant in January 1673, then Mignon on 26 August 1678, and Coche in 1692 (as a flûte); deleted 1704.
- Actif, 32 guns, launched 1672 at Brest – renamed Emerillon on 7 January 1673; captured by the British Navy in 1693.
- Dur, 28 guns, design by Hendrick, launched February 1673 at Dunkirk – renamed Éveillé in June 1671, then Bien Aimée in 1685 (when reclassed as frégate légère); deleted 1693 (possibly captured by English Navy, becoming Dover Prize).
- Éclair, 32 guns, design by Pierre Malet, but built by Abraham Aubier, launched 28 May 1673 at Rochefort – renamed Soleil d'Afrique on 6 December 1675, then Lyon on 26 August 1678; fireship 1695, sold on 24 December 1710.
- Caché class, designed by Laurent Hubac with 16 × 8-pounder and 16 × 6 (or 4)-pounder guns:
  - Entreprenant, 32 guns, launched October 1673 at Brest – renamed Dragon on 28 November 1673; reclassed as a flûte in 1709, taken to pieces 1712.
  - Caché, 32 guns, launched October 1673 at Brest – renamed Arrogant on 28 November 1673, then Galant on 28 June 1678; wrecked off Portugal in March 1684.
- Facheux class – see now under 1st Order frigates above.
- Dauphin, or Dauphin de Bayonne, 28 guns, design by Honoré Malet, purchased April 1674 – renamed Perle in December 1675; deletede 1690.
- Palmier class, designed by Benjamin Chaillé with 18 × 8-pounder and 18 × 6-pounder guns:
  - Palmier, launched 23 December 1676 at Le Havre – sold 1709.
  - Adroit, launched 15 July 1677 at Le Havre – captured by the Dutch Navy in January 1689.
- Marquis, (ex-Laurier), 28 guns, design by Laurent Hubac, launched 1679 at Brest – wrecked off Brest 1684.
- Hercule, 30 guns, design by Laurent Hubac, launched 1679 at Brest – burnt November 1704 to avoid capture.
- Hirondelle, 28 guns, design by Laurent Hubac, launched 1679 at Brest – deleted 1687.
- Marin, 30 guns, design by Honoré Malet, launched July 1679 at Rochefort – deleted 1705.
- Royale, 36 guns, design by Laurent Coulomb, launched November 1679 at Toulon – renamed Serieux in January 1680, then Croissant in June 1690; burnt November 1704 to avoid capture.
- Soleil d'Afrique, 28 guns, design by Pierre Malet, launched 1681 at Rochefort – deleted 1698.
- Jeux, 30 guns, design by Hendrick, launched 8 January 1689 at Dunkirk – captured by the English Navy in May 1689, becoming HMS Play Prize.
- Gaillarde class – designed by Masson, with 20 × 8-pounder and 12 × 4-pounder guns:
  - Gaillarde, 32 guns, 35.1 × 9.2 × 4.1 × 4.5 meters, 200 tons, launched 1689 at Rochefort – sold 1711.
  - Badine, 32 guns, launched June 1689 at Rochefort – wrecked 1705.
- Capricieux, 34 guns, design by Howens Hendrick, launched July 1689 at Dunkirk – wrecked January 1690.
- Jeux class – 36-gun design by Howens Hendrick with 18 × 8-pdrs and 18 × 4-pdrs.
  - Jeux, launched November 1689 at Dunkirk – captured by the English Navy in July 1706, becoming HMS Childs Play.
  - Tigre, launched 1689 at Dunkirk.
- Aigle class – 36-gun design by Félix Arnaud:
  - Aigle, launched early 1692 at Bayonne – wrecked February 1712 at Cayenne.
  - Favori, launched early 1692 at Bayonne – expended 1702 as a fireship.
- Volontaire, 40 guns, design by François Coulomb, launched 1693 at Toulon – wrecked March 1695.
- Mutine, 34 guns, design by Pierre Coulomb, launched July 1693 and renamed Sphere in September 1693 – deleted 1695.
- Oiseau, 30–32 guns, design by Etienne Hubac, launched September 1695 at Brest – burnt November 1704 to avoid capture.
- Bellone, 30–38 guns, Blaise Pangalo design, launched January 1696 at Brest – hulked 1719, taken to pieces 1741.
- Hermione, 30 (later 36) guns, Etienne Hubac design, launched September 1699 at Brest – lost 1705.
- Meduse, 30 guns, design by Blaise Pangalo, launched September 1699 at Brest – reduced to frégate légère in 1705, wrecked February 1713.
- Heroine, 38 guns, design by Antoine Tassy, launched 1699 at Bayonne – wrecked 1702.
- Hirondelle, 36 (later 30) guns, rebuilding of ex-Algerine ship of 1687 (see below), re-launched 19 March 1700 at Toulon – wrecked 1703 or 1704.
- Vénus, 32 guns, design by Antoine Tassy, launched 1704 at Bayonne – deleted 1722.
- Junon, 36/40 guns, design by Philippe Cochois, launched 4 December 1709 at Le Havre as privateer but seized for Navy while building; restored to owner at launch and never served in French Navy.

Enemy frigates or equivalent captured by the French Navy 1654–1703 and classed as Frégates du Deuxième Ordre.

- Saint Antoine, 38 guns (Spanish San Antonio, captured March 1654) – wrecked in September 1670.
- Perle, 34 guns (Algerine Tric, captured June 1663) – converted to fireship in June 1674, sold November 1676.
- Étoile de Diane, 34/36 guns (Algerine Nejma, captured October 1664) – converted to fireship in 1675 and renamed Bretonne; taken to pieces 1678.
- Soleil d'Afrique, 30/34 guns (Algerine Chems, captured August 1665) – converted to fireship in June 1674, sold November 1676.
- Croissant d'Afrique, 30/34 guns (Algerine Hillel, captured August 1665) – converted to fireship in 1674, renamed Facheux in January 1675 but taken to pieces in same year.
- Palmier, 24 guns (Algerine Nekhla, captured August 1665) – converted to fireship in June 1671 and renamed Actif, taken to pieces in 1672.
- Ligournois, 24/28 guns (Tunisian, captured November 1665) – renamed Emerillon in June 1671; converted to fireship in April 1672 and burnt at Solebay in June 1672.
- Soleil d'Alger, 36 guns (Algerine al-Sameche, captured July 1687) – renamed Galant in November 1688; returned to Algerines in December 1689.
- Trois Roses, 32 guns (Algerine Ilalatha Warda al-Dhabe, captured October 1687) – renamed Hirondelle in November 1688; rebuilt 1699–1700 at Toulon (see above).
- Mercure, 30 guns (English Mercury, captured 1690) – burnt at La Hogue in March 1692.
- Weeps, 32 guns (Dutch Weesp, captured June 1694) – sold 1705.
- Zeripze, 30 guns (Dutch Zeerijp, captured June 1694) – deleted 1705.
- Ludlow, 30 guns (English Ludlow, captured January 1703) – hulked 1719.
- Vigilante, 32 guns (Dutch Waakzaamheid, captured March 1703) – deleted 1704–05.
- Rozendal, 34 guns (Dutch Rozendaal, captured May 1703) – deleted 1712.
- Saemslack, 30–34 guns (Dutch Zaanslagh, captured July/August 1703) – deleted 1717.
- Milford, 30–32 guns (English Milford, captured 1697 by a French privateer – bought for French Navy 1703) – hulked May 1717, taken to pieces 1720.
- Fowey, 30 guns (English Fowey, captured August 1704) – hulked 1713, taken to pieces c.1720.
- Sorlingue, 32 guns (English Sorlings, captured October 1705) – sold as privateer 1709, retaken by British Navy 1711.

=== Light Frigates (Frégates légères) ===
These were single-decked unranked ships (i.e. classified as below the cinqième rang), carrying a battery of 6-pounder or 8-pounder guns on their sole gundeck. An estimated 162 of these were placed in service between 1661 and 1715, of which the following is simply a partial list, and needs expansion.

- Éminente, former Dunkirk vessel of same name, captured in June 1658; deleted 1666.
- Saint Anne, purchased in Holland 1660 by Nicolas Fouquet as Sainte Anne de Biscaye, confiscated in September 1661 for French Navy and name shortened; grounded 1670 and BU.
- Belle-Ile, built 1661 at Rochefort for Nicolas Fouquet, confiscated in September 1661 for French Navy; renamed Feé in 1671; deleted 1674.
- Aurore, launched November 1665 at Brest – renamed Sibylle on 24 June 1671; deleted 1675.
- Diligente, 16 guns, designed/built by Laurent Hubac, launched 1666 at Brest; deleted April 1674 at Pondicherry and BU.
- Christine, launched 1666.
- Dieppoise class.
  - Gaillarde, 14 guns, launched April 1668 at Dieppe – renamed Inconnu in May 1678, then Incommode in June 1678, reclassed as fireship; taken to pieces in June 1681.
  - Dieppoise, 14 guns, launched April 1668 at Dieppe – renamed Lutine 24 June 1671; sold April 1675.
- Bretonne, 12 guns, design by Laurent Hubac, launched October 1670 at Brest – renamed Tempete on 24 June 1671; captured by Spanish in July 1675.
- Normande, 10 guns, design by Laurent Hubac, launched November 1670 at Brest – renamed Aurore on 24 June 1671, then Volante in 1688 and Abondante in February 1692; deleted 1792.
- Embuscade, 18 guns, design by Jean Tortel, launched July 1670 at Le Havre – renamed Dangereux in 1677, then restored to Embuscade in same year; re-classed as fireship 1677, then sold 1688.
- Friponne class, design by Honoré Malet:
  - Friponne, 14 (later 20) guns, launched November 1670 at Rochefort – captured by the English Navy in December 1690.
  - Mutine, (ex-Lutine), 14 (later 20) guns, launched November 1670 at Rochefort – captured by privateers in June 1675.
- Tempête, 28 guns, design by Joseph Saboulin, launched May 1676 at Rochefort; deleted 1690.
- Fée class, design by Laurent Hubac, 28 guns:
  - Fée, launched August 1676 at Brest - sold 1685 but reacquired 1690 as Jalouse; condemned 1698.
  - Mutine, launched August 1676 at Brest - wrecked in February 1694.
- Diligente, 28 guns, design by Jean Guichard, launched 1676 at Rochefort; deleted 1691.
- Serpente, 26 guns, design by Howens Hendrick, launched 23 June 1678 at Dunkirk – deleted 1691.
- Charmante class, designed by Howens Hendrick, with 10 × 4-pounder guns:
  - Charmante, launched July 1678 at Dunkirk – deleted 1684.
  - Badine, launched July 1678 at Dunkirk – deleted 1684.
- Bouffonne, 18 (later 26) guns, design by Laurent Hubac, launched 1678 at Brest – deleted 1696.
- Favorite class, designed by François Pomet, with 12 guns originally, but by 1687 with 20 × 8-pounder and 8 × 4-pounder guns:
  - Favorite, launched November 1678 at Rochefort – captured in August 1694 by Dutch Navy in the Mediterranean.
  - Gaillarde, launched November 1678 at Rochefort – renamed Gaillard in 1690 as a fireship, then Séditieux in January 1691; restored as light frigate 1695; deleted 1698.
- Gentille class, designed by Pierre Chaillé, with 14 or 16 guns:
  - Gentille, launched 1689 at Le Havre.
  - Gracieuse, launched 1689 at Le Havre.
- Trompeuse class, designed by Howens Hendrick, with 12 guns:
  - Trompeuse, launched 1689 at Dunkirk.
  - Charmante, launched 1689 at Dunkirk.
  - Fée, 1689.
- Aurore, 20 guns, design by Howens Hendrick, launched 1689 at Dunkirk – captured by the English Navy 19 August 1697.
- Railleuse, 18 guns, design by Howens Hendrick, launched 1689 at Dunkirk – burnt 5 August 1703.
- Curieux, 24 guns, built as the privateer Fin at Malta, launched August 1689 and seized for the French Navy in November 1690 – sold April 1692.
- Bonne, 12 guns, design by François LeBrun, launched January 1692 at Brest – sold 1707.
- Choquante, 12 guns, design by Laurent Helie, launched January 1692 at Brest – burnt at the Battle of Vigo Bay in October 1702.
- Serpente, 14 guns, design by Bernard Renau d'Eliçagaray, launched January 1692 at Le Havre – wrecked November 1692 off Dunkirk.
- Diligente, 10 guns, design by Etienne Salican, launched July 1692 at Le Havre – captured by the English Navy in May 1694.
- Emeraude, 10 guns, design by Howens Hendrick, launched January 1692 at Dunkirk – burnt at the Battle of Vigo Bay in October 1702.
- Naïade, 12 guns, design by Howens Hendrick, launched February 1692 at Dunkirk – deleted 1695.
- Audacieuse, 12 guns, design by Howens Hendrick, launched February 1692 at Dunkirk – wrecked September 1706.
- Suffisante, 12 guns, design by Howens Hendrick, launched February 1692 at Dunkirk – deleted in 1695.
- Héroïne, 14 guns, launched 29 July 1692 at Brest – captured by the English Navy in July 1694, becoming HMS Essex Prize.
- Naiade, 20 guns, design by Blaise Pangalo, launched May 1696 at Brest – deleted 1705.
- Nereïde, 20 guns, design by Blaise Pangalo, launched May 1696 at Brest – deleted 1712.
- Héroïne class:
  - Héroïne, 20 guns, launched 30 May 1696 at Brest – captured by the Spanish 1697.
  - Galathée, 20 guns, launched 13 August 1696 at Brest – captured by the English Navy 1708.
- Salamandre, (bomb vessel) 20 guns and 2 mortars, launched October 1696 at Toulon – sold 1709.
- Friponne, 16 guns, 1696.
- Aurore, 22 guns, Philippe Cochois design, launched 3 August 1697 at Le Havre – captured by the English Navy in July 1697.
- Gracieuse, 16 guns, design by Philippe Cochois, launched January 1702 at Le Havre – captured by the English Navy May 1702, becoming HMS Rochester Prize.
- Gentille, 12 guns, design by Gueroult, launched May 1702 at Dieppe – sold June 1702.
- Nymphe, 26 guns, design by Philippe Cochois, launched 26 May 1702 at Le Havre – deleted 1719.
- Dauphine, 28 guns, design by Philippe Cochois, launched 26 August 1703 at Le Havre – wrecked 1705.
- Étoile, 30 guns, design by Philippe Cochois, launched 25 October 1703 at Le Havre – captured by the English Navy November 1704, becoming HMS Swallow's Prize, 32.
- Victoire, 26 guns, design by René LeVasseur, launched September 1704 at Dunkirk, rebuilt 1736–37. Broken up 1743
- Fortune, 20 guns, design by René LeVasseur, launched September 1704 at Dunkirk – captured December 1711 by the British Navy (?), but returned; deleted 1726.
- Diane, 28 guns, design by Pierre Coulomb, launched November 1704 at Lorient – wrecked 1705.
- Embuscade, 30 guns, design by Pierre Chaillé, launched 1704 at Le Havre – captured May 1707 by the British Navy.
- Naiade, 28 guns, acquired 1706 at St Malo – deleted 1710.
- Zéphir, 24 guns, design by René LeVasseur, launched 1706 at Dunkirk – wrecked 1713.
- Astrée, 24 guns, design by Blaise Pangalo, launched 3 May 1707 at Brest – believed lost at Barcelona 1719.
- Biche, 20 guns, design by Jacques Bouillan, launched 1707 at Port-Royal (Acadie) – lost 1709.
- Valeur, 34 guns, design by Desjumeaux, launched November 1707 at Bayonne – deleted 1720.
- Astrée, 24 guns, design by Blaiuse Pangalo, launched 3 May 1707 at Brest - lost at Barcelona in January 1719.
- Amarante, 14 guns, design by Philippe Cochois, launched 29 March 1708 at Le Havre – deleted 1724.
- Galathée, 28 guns, design by Philippe Cochois, launched 16 August 1708 at Le Havre – captured by the British Navy in February 1712.

Enemy frigates or equivalent captured by the French Navy 1654–1703 and classed as frégates légères

- Moqueuse, 6 guns (Dutch, captured December 1674).
- Orage, 24 guns (Spanish San Antonio, captured 1675).
- Caravelle, (Algerine, captured June 1683) – renamed Trompeuse in March 1684, returned to Algerines in April 1685.
- Dragon d'Or, 16 guns (Algerine Tinine Dahabia, captured August 1687) – renamed Moqueuse November 1688, returned to Algerines February 1691.
- Pélican, 18/20 guns (Scottish Pelican, captured July 1689).
- Jeanette, 12 guns (Scottish Janet, captured July 1689) – renamed Normande in January 1691, then Enflammé in 1694.
- Salamandre, 20 guns (Brandenburg Salamander, captured 1693).
- Nieuport, 24 guns (English Newport, captured July 1696) – hulked June 1716, taken to pieces 1740.
- Quatre Frères, 14 guns (Dutch Vier Broers, captured April 1702).

== Frigates under Louis XV (1715–1774) ==
From 1715 onwards, it is more appropriate to classify frégates according to their principal armament, i.e. by the weight of shot fired by the principal battery of guns carried by those ships - although the older categories of 4th Rank (frégates de premier rang), 5th Rank (frégates de second rang) and unrated light frigates (frégates légères) nominally remained in force until the 1780s. The smaller frigates were those mounting 6-pounder guns in their main battery, while larger frigates carried 8-pounder or 12-pounder guns (note that these "pounds" were actually French livres, of about 7.9% greater weight than British Imperial pounds). Later in the century, 18-pounder or 24-pounder frigates were introduced, and from the 1820s 32-pounder guns were carried as the principal battery on larger frigates.

=== 6-pounder armed frigates (most are frégates légères) ===
The category of frégate légère ceased in 1748, after which no further 6-pounder frigates were built.

- Thétis, (one-off 26-gun design of 1722 by Jacques Poirier, with 20 × 6-pounder and 6 × 4-pounder guns, 32.5 × 8.9 × 2.7 × 4.4 meters, 250 French tons, complement 100 peace / 170 war, launched September 1722 at Le Havre) – broken up 1730.
- Vénus, (one-off 26-gun design of 1722 by Jacques Poirier, with 20 × 6-pounder and 6 × 4-pounder guns; launched October 1723 at Le Havre) – wrecked 1745.
- Flore (26-gun design of 1727 by Pierre-Blaise Coulomb, with 4 × 8-pounders on the lower deck and 22 × 6-pounders on the gun deck; launched 28 November 1728 - Hulked at Marseille 1753, condemned 1754 and sold for commerce in 1759 or 1761, in this connection captured by Britain 1762.
- Gazelle, (one-off 18-gun design of 1732 by Jacques Poirier, with 18 × 6-pounder guns only, 29.2 × 8.3 × 3.6 × 4.3 metres, 150 French tons, complement 50 peace / 150 war; launched September 1733 at Le Havre) – hulked 1745, taken to pieces 1748.
- Victoire, (one-off 22-gun design of 1736 by Blaise Geslain, with 22 × 6-pounder guns, 32.5 × 8.8 × 3.5 × 4.2 meters, 280 French tons, complement 120 peace / 150 war; rebuilt from frigate of 1704 and launched 1737 at Rochefort) – deleted 1743.
- Subtile, (one-off 20-gun design of 1740 by Jacques Poirier, with 20 × 6-pounder guns, 33.1 × 9.1 × 3.9 × 4.5 metres, 300 French tons, complement 80 peace / 150 war; launched June or July 1741 at Le Havre) – captured by British Navy 1746, but not added to the RN.
- Panthère, (one-off 20-gun design of 1743 by Jacques-Luc Coulomb, with 20 × 6-pounder guns; launched February 1744 at Brest) – captured by British Navy 26 March 1745 in the Channel, becoming HMS Amazon.
- Galatée class (24-gun design of 1744 by Mathurin-Louis and Jean Geoffroy, with 24 × 6-pounder guns).
  - Galatée. (launched 13 September 1744 at Brest) – captured by British Navy 7 April 1758 but not added to the RN.
  - Mutine, (launched 16 October 1744 at Brest) – taken to pieces at Martinique 1758.
- Martre, (24-gun design of 1745 by René-Nicolas Levasseur, with 20 × 6-pounders and 4 × 4-pounders; launched 6 June 1746) - deleted and hulked at Rochefort 1753, last mentioned 1757.
- Maréchal de Saxe, (22- or 24-gun privateer frigate purchased at Saint-Malo in February 1748; caliber of guns unclear) - deleted and hulked 1753, dismantled 1755.
- Guirlande, (one-off 22-gun design of 1756 by Pierre Salinoc, with 18 × 6-pounder and 4 × 4-pounder guns; launched January 1757 at Brest) – captured by British Navy in August 1758, becoming HMS Cygnet.
- Terpsichore, (28-gun merchant frigate of 1757 by Jacques & Daniel Denys, with 22 × 6-pounder and 6 × 3-pounder guns; purchased on the stocks in February 1758 while building and launched in June 1758 at Dunkirk) – captured by British Navy in February 1760, becoming HMS Terpsichore.
- Zénobie, (24-gun east indiaman Maréchal d'Estrées purchased shortly after her launch in May 1759 at Le Havre and renamed Zénobie, with 24 × 6-pounders (or maybe 24 × 8-pounders) - on loan to the East India Company from January 1762, lost with all hands off Portland in November 1762.
- Guirlande, (26-gun privateer frigate, probably with 22 × 6-pounders and 4 × 4-pounders; launched 1760 at Nantes and purchased in November 1761) - captured by the British navy 18 August 1762.
- Étourdie, (20-gun privateer frigate purchased on the stocks in November 1761, with 16 × 6-pounders and 4 × 4-pounders; launched at Nantes in 1762) - reclassed as a corvette 1768, great repair in 1772, foundered on the Île de Sein 1783.
- Bayonnaise, (24-gun design of 1762 by one of the Gassies brothers (Pierre or Dominique, presented to the King by the city of Bayonne, with 22 × 6-pounders and 2 × 4-pounders; launched in April 1764) - foundered at Santo Domingo in August 1765.

=== 8-pounder armed frigates (frégates du deuxième ordre) ===
- Astrée, (30-gun design by Blaise Ollivier, with 22 × 8-pounder and 8 × 4-pounder guns 35.4 × 9.4 × 4.2 meters, 412 French tons, launched January 1728 at Brest) – broken up 1741.
- Zéphyr, (28-gun design by François Coulomb, with 22 × 8-pounder, 4 × 4-pounder and 2 × 4-pounder guns – launched 16 November 1728 at Toulon) – captured off Brest by the British Navy on 1 September 1762.
- Médée, (26-gun design by Blaise Ollivier, with 26 × 8-pounder guns – launched February 1741 at Brest) – captured by British Navy 4 April 1744, but not added to RN, instead sold as privateer Boscawen.
- Atalante, (one-off 32/34-gun design of 1740 by Joseph Chapelle, with 10 or 12 × 12-pounders on the lower deck and 22 × 8-pounders on the gun deck; launched at Toulon on 16 March 1741) - sunk on the Saint Lawrence river in a battle with British Forces in June 1760.
- Volage, (24-gun design by Pierre Morineau, with 24 × 8-pounder guns, 36.4 × 10.2 × 4.4 × 4.8 meters, 480 French tons, complement 180 peace / 215 war, launched 1 April 1741 at Rochefort) – captured by British Navy 4 April 1746, retaken by the French the following day and deleted 1753.
- Fine class (28-gun design by Pierre Chaillé, with 24 × 8-pdrs and 4 × 4-pounder guns).
  - Fine, (launched 27 May 1744 at Le Havre) – wrecked December 1745 off Montrose.
  - Emeraude, (launched 10 June 1744 at Le Havre) – captured by British Navy 21 September 1757, becoming HMS Emerald.
- Sirène class (30-gun design of 1744 by Jacques-Luc Coulomb, with 26 × 8-pounder and 4 × 4-pounder guns).
  - Sirène, (launched 24 September 1744 at Brest) – captured by British Navy 18 October 1760 but not added to RN.
  - Renommée, (launched 19 December 1744 at Brest) – captured by British Navy 27 September 1747, becoming HMS Renown.
- Amphitrite class (30-gun design of 1744 by Venard, with 26 × 8-pounder and 4 × 4-pounder guns).
  - Amphitrite, (launched 1744 at Bayonne) – wrecked 1745.
  - Mégère, (launched December 1744 at Bayonne) – deleted 1753.
- Diane, (one-off 30-gun design of 1743 by François Coulomb jr., with 4 × 12-pounders on the lower deck, 22 × 8-pounders on the gun deck and 4 × 4-pounders above; launched at Toulon on 19 December 1744) - fitted "en flûte" with reduced armament of 20 × 8-pounders in April 1758, captured by the British Navy and foundered the same year.
- Embuscade, (one-off 38-gun design by Pierre Chaillé, with 26 × 8-pounder and 12 × 4-pounder guns; launched 19 March 1745 at Le Havre) – captured by British Navy in May 1746, becoming HMS Ambuscade.
- Castor type (26-gun design of 1744 by René-Nicolas Levasseur, with 26 × 8-pounders)
  - Castor, (launched 16 May 1745 in Québec) - captured by the British Navy in February 1748, not taken into service.
  - Martre, (launched 6 June 1746 in Québec) - hulked 1753.
- Favorite, (one-off 38-gun design by Pierre Chaillé, with 28 × 8-pounder and 10 × 4-pounder guns; launched autumn 1747 at Le Havre) – hulked 1757, deleted 1771.
- Friponne, (one-off 24-gun design by Pierre Morineau, with 24 × 8-pounder guns; launched 1747 at Rochefort) – hulked 1761, sold 1762.
- Fidèle, (one-off 24/26-gun design by Julien Geslain, with 24/26 × 8-pounder (and later 4 × 4-pounder) guns; launched early 1748 at Rochefort) – sunk as blockship at Louisbourg June 1758.
- Topaze class, (24/26-gun design by Jean-Joseph Ginoux, with 24/26 × 8-pounder guns).
  - Topaze, (launched 30 October 1750 at Brest) – deleted 1775.
  - Thétis, (launched 17 November 1751 at Brest) – deleted 1777.
  - Heroine, (launched 20 December 1752 at Brest) – deleted 1766.
- Nymphe, (24-gun design by Antoine Groignard, with 20 × 8-pounder and 4 × 4-pounder guns – launched early 1752 at Rochefort) – burnt to avoid capture 1757 at Majorca.
- Rose, (one-off 30-gun design of 1749 by Joseph Chapelle, with 8 × 12-pounders on the lower deck and 22 × 8-pounders (or 6-pounders) on the gun deck; launched 22 October 1752 at Toulon) – sold 1781.
- Comète class, (30-gun design by Joseph-Louis Ollivier, with 26 × 8-pounder and 4 × 4-pounder guns).
  - Comète, (launched 20 December 1752 at Brest) – captured by British Navy 16 March 1761, becoming HMS Comet.
  - Fleur de Lys, (launched 1 June 1754 at Brest) – burnt to avoid capture 19 October 1760.
  - Concorde, (launched 15 November 1755 at Brest) – wrecked 1756.
- Améthyste, (30-gun design by Mathurin-Louis Geoffroy, with 26 × 8-pounder guns – launched 3 June 1754 at Brest) – found unfit for service, condemned and hulked 1763, dismantled 1771.
- Valeur, (24-gun design by François-Guillaume Clairin-Deslauriers, with 20 × 8-pounder guns – launched 29 October 1754 at Rochefort) – sold 1764.
- Blonde class, (32-gun design by Jean-Joseph Ginoux, with 26 × 8-pounder and 6 × 4-pounder guns).
  - Blonde, (launched 23 August 1755 at Le Havre) – captured by British Navy 28 February 1760, becoming HMS Blonde.
  - Brune, (launched 7 September 1755 at Le Havre) – captured by British Navy 30 January 1761, becoming HMS Brune.
  - Aigrette, (launched 1756 at Le Havre) – condemned at Brest 1789.
  - Vestale, (launched March 1756 at Le Havre) – captured by British Navy 8 January 1761, becoming HMS Flora, scuttled at Rhode Island to prevent capture by the Americans in 1778, an attempt to burn her failed and so she was refloated by the US; after the War of Independence she was either presented to or repurchased by the French in 1784, renamed Flore Américaine, fitted as a privateer in 1793, taken by HMS Phaeton (1782) in 1798, not recommissioned.
  - Félicité, (launched 1756 at Le Havre) – captured and burnt by British Navy 24 January 1761.
- Pléïade, (26-gun design by Joseph Coulomb, with 26 × 8-pounder guns – launched 17 November 1755 at Toulon) – sold 1786.
- Licorne class, (30-gun design of 1754 by Jean Geoffroy, with 26 × 8-pounder and 4 × 4-pounder guns).
  - Licorne, (launched December 1755 at Brest) – sank in a storm 1763, but was refloated and repaired at Brest 1764, damaged in a cyclone and repaired at Pointe-à-Pitre, Guadeloupe in 1776, captured by British Navy 1778, becoming HMS Licorne.
  - Sauvage, (launched 3 January 1756 at Brest) – wrecked March 1759 off Poitou.
  - Hermine, (launched May 1757 at Bayonne) – wrecked December 1761 off Vigo.
  - Opale, (launched May 1757 at Bayonne) – wrecked July 1762 off San Domingo.
- Minerve class (30-gun design of 1754 by Jacques-Luc Coulomb, with 26 × 8-pounder and 4 × 4-pounder guns).
  - Minerve, (launched 15 February 1756 at Toulon) – wrecked October 1762 off Villefranche.
  - Oiseau, (launched 25 April 1757 at Toulon) – captured by British Navy 23 October 1762.
- Bellone, (one-off 32-gun design of 1755 by François-Guillaume Clairin-Deslauriers, with 28 × 8-pounders and 4 × 4-pounders; launched in September 1757) - captured by Britain on 21 February 1759 and renamed HMS Repulse.
- Diligente, (one-off 26-gun design of 1755 by Joseph-Louis Ollivier and Jacques-Luc Coulomb, with 26 × 8-pounder and 6 × 4-pounder guns, launched 28 April 1756 for the French East India Company, and purchased in April 1761 for the French Navy).
- Pélerine, (36-gun privateer frigate designed by Jean-Joseph Ginoux, with 4 × 12-pounders on the lower deck, a main armament of 24 × 8-pounders on the gun deck and 8 × 6-pounders above; purchased at the time of her launch at Le Havre in December 1757) - renamed Aréthuse 1758, captured by the British Navy 18 May 1759 and renamed HMS Arethusa.
- Maréchal de Richelieu, (30-gun privateer frigate with 24 × 8-pounders and 6 × 4-pounders; purchased on the stocks in December 1757 and launched a few days later either in December 1757 or January 1758 at Nantes) - renamed Echo after her launch, captured by the British Navy May 1758 near Louisbourg and taken into the Navy as HMS Echo.
- Bouffonne class (32-gun design of 1757 by Jean-Joseph Ginoux, with 26 × 8-pounders and 6 × 4-pounders) - both frigates of the class were begun at Caen but construction there was cancelled in October 1757 after it was realized that the Orne river would be too shallow for the new frigates. They were then taken to pieces and the parts transferred to Le Havre where they were finished.
  - Bouffonne, (launched 29 or 30 June 1758 at Le Havre) - captured by the British Navy off the Spanish coast on 17 Julye 1761 and not fitted for sea.
  - Malicieuse, (launched 1 or 3 July 1758 at Le Havre) - condemned at Brest and taken apart in 1777.
- Danaé, (one-off 32-gun design of 1762 by Antoine Groignard, with 26 × 8-pounders and 6 × 4-pounders; launched at Indret on 22 October 1763) - run aground near Cancale to avoid capture by the British and abandoned by her crew on 13 May 1779, refloated by the British Navy and taken into service as HMS Danae.
- Mignonne, (one-off 30-gun design of 1765 by Claud Saucillon, with 26 × 8-pounder and 4 × 4-pounder guns, launched 26 April 1767 at Toulon) – captured by British Navy 1794, becoming HMS Mignonne; burnt in 1797 as useless.
- Zephyr, (one-off 32-gun design of 1767 by Joseph-Louis Ollivier, with 26 × 8-pounder and 6 × 4-pounder guns, launched 23 October 1768 at Brest) – burnt by accident at Brest in February 1779.
- Flore, (one-off 32-gun design of 1768 by Antoine Groignard, with 26 × 8-pounder and 6 × 4-pounder guns, launched 11 November 1768 at Brest) – deleted 1787.
- Oiseau, (one-off 32-gun design of 1767 by François-Guillaume Clairin-Deslauriers, with 26 × 8-pounder and 6 × 4-pounder guns, launched 11 January 1769 at Rochefort) – captured by British Navy 31 January 1779, becoming HMS Oiseau.

=== 12-pounder armed frigates ===
- Favorite, (one-off 38-gun design of 1747 by Pierre Chaillé, with 28 × 12-pounders and 10 × 4-pounders; launched in Autumn 1747 at Le Havre) - hulked as receiving ship at Brest in 1757, last mentioned in 1771.
- Hermione, (one-off 26-gun design of 1748 by Pierre Morineau, with 26 × 12-pounder guns, launched 28 April 1749 at Rochefort) – captured by British Navy November 1757, becoming HMS Unicorn's Prize.
- Gracieuse, (one-off 24-gun design of 1749 by Joseph Chapelle, with 24 × 12-pounder guns, launched 23 April 1750 at Toulon) – sold 1781.
- Abénakise class (38-gun 1st order ship frigate, design of 1753 by René-Nicolas Levasseur, with 8 × 18-pounders on the lower deck, 28 × 12-pounders on the gun deck and 2 × 4-pounders above)
  - Abénakise, (launched at Québec in June 1756) - captured by the British Navy on the Atlantic Ocean on 23 November 1757 and renamed HMS Aurora in British service.
  - Québec, (never launched) – burned on the stocks by British forces at the capture of Quebec.
- Danaé, (one-off 38-gun design of 1756 by Jean-Joseph Ginoux, with 30 × 12-pounder and 8 × 6-pounder guns, launched 13 September 1756 at Le Havre) – captured by British Navy 28 March 1759, becoming HMS Danae.
- Hébé, (one-off 36-gun design of 1756 by Jean-Joseph Ginoux, with 2 × 18-pounder, 28 × 12-pounder and 6 × 6-pounder guns, launched 7? June 1757 at Le Havre) – wrecked in the Canary Islands September 1763.
- Chimère, (one-off 30-gun design of 1756 by Joseph Coulomb, with 26 × 12-pounder and 4 × 6-pounder guns, launched 6 February 1758 at Toulon) – sold 1783.
- Hussar (ex-British Hussar (1757), captured 1762).
- Terpsichore, (one-off 30-gun design of 1762 by Antoine Groignard, with 30 × 12-pounder guns, launched 10 August 1763 at Indret) – deleted 1783.
- Sultane, (one-off 30-gun design of 1764 by Jean-Baptiste Doumet-Revest, with 26 × 12-pounder and 4 × 6-pounder guns, launched 28 June 1765 at Toulon) – captured by British Navy 1793 at Toulon and burnt.
- Infidèle class (32-gun design by Jean-Joseph Ginoux, with 26 × 12-pounder and 6 × 6-pounder guns).
  - Infidèle, (launched June 1765 at Le Havre) - hulked 1777 at Brest and taken apart in 1783.
  - Légère, (launched June 1765 at Le Havre) - found unfit for service at Brest and deleted in 1777 but refitted as a privateer (or a transport?) in 1780, run aground by a British ship and destroyed in July 1780.
  - Sincère, (launched 12 March 1766 at Le Havre) - was in need of a great repair/rebuild and sold at Brest to private investors in the end of 1777.
  - Inconstante, (launched 26 March 1766 at Le Havre) - sheathed with copper in 1780, accidentally caught fire and exploded near the Île à Vache, off the south-west coast of Haiti in 1781.
  - Blanche, (launched 20 October 1766 at Le Havre) - captured by the British Navy on 21 December 1779 and incorporated as HMS Blanche.
  - Enjouée, (launched 4 November 1766 at Le Havre) - hulked at Brest in 1777 and dismantled in 1783.
- Dédaigneuse class (32-gun design by Leon-Michel Guignace, with 26 × 12-pounder and 6 × 6-pounder guns).
  - Dédaigneuse, (launched 12 April 1766 at Bordeaux).
  - Belle Poule, (launched 18 November 1766 at Bordeaux)- captured off the Loire by HMS Nonsuch and taken into the British Navy under her former name in July 1780.
  - Impérieuse, (launched 26 October 1768 at Bordeaux, renamed Amphitrite after her launch).
  - Tourterelle, (launched 18 September 1770 at Bordeaux) - condemned 1783 and taken to pieces at Brest 1784.
- Engageante, (one-off 32-gun design by Jean-Francois Estienne, with 26 × 12-pounder and 6 × 6-pounder guns, launched 14 November 1766 at Toulon) – captured by British Navy 23 April 1794 in the Channel and incorporated as HMS Engageante.
- Atalante, (one-off 32-gun design of 1767 by Joseph Coulomb, with 26 × 12-pounder and 6 × 6-pounder guns, launched 1 May 1768 at Toulon) – captured by British Navy 5 May 1794 off Cork, becoming HMS Espion.
- Boudeuse class (34-gun design by Jean-Hyacinthe Raffeau, with 28 × 12-pounder and 6 × 6-pounder guns).
  - Boudeuse, (launched 25 March 1766 at Indret) – deleted broken up for fuel July 1800 at Valetta, Malta.
  - Indiscrète, (launched 13 March 1767 at Indret) – deleted 1785.
  - Sensible, (launched 15 March 1767 at Indret) – deleted 1789.
- Renommée, (one-off 40-gun design by Antoine Groignard, with 30 × 12-pounder and 10 × 8-pounder guns, launched 22 August 1767 at Brest) – deleted 1783.
- Zéphyr, (one-off 32-gun design by Joseph-Louis Ollivier, with 26 × 12-pounder and 6 × 6-pounder guns, launched 23 October 1768 at Brest) – burnt by accident 1779.
- Aurore, (one-off 34-gun design of 1766 by Jean-Denis Chevillard, with 26 × 12-pounder and 8 × 6-pounder guns, launched 23 November 1768 at Rochefort) – captured by British Navy on 29 August 1793 at Toulon.

=== 18-pounder/24-pounder armed frigates ===
- Pourvoyeuse class (38-gun design by Louis Boux, with 26 × 24-pounder and 12 × 8-pounder guns). In practice the 24-pounders were replaced by 18-pounders.
  - Pourvoyeuse, 38 (launched 10 November 1772 at Lorient) - deleted at Brest in 1786.
  - Consolante, 38 (launched 26 June 1775 at Lorient) - deleted and hulked at Brest in 1785, broken up in 1804.

== Frigates of Louis XVI (1774–1792), the Revolutionary era and the First Empire (to 1815) ==
=== 8-pounder armed frigates ===
- Pallas, was built and launched at Saint-Malo as Prince de Conti in 1773. The French Navy bought her at Saint-Malo in July 1777 for Lt123,654. She was armed with 26 × 8-pounder + 6 × 4-pounder guns. The British captured her on 19 June 1778 before the official outbreak of war and took her into service as HMS Inconstant. The Royal Navy sold her in 1782.
- Alcmène class (26-gun design of 1773 by Antoine Groignard, with 26 × 8-pounder guns – 6 × 4-pounder guns added later to the quarterdeck).
  - Alcmène, (launched 14 June 1774 at Toulon) – captured by British Navy 21 October 1779, becoming HMS Alcmene.
  - Aimable, (launched 20 July 1776 at Toulon) – captured by British Navy in the Battle of the Mona Passage 19 April 1782, becoming HMS Aimable.
- Comtesse d'Artois class (24-gun design of 1779 by Jacques and Daniel Denis, with 20 × 8-pounders and 4 × 6-pounder obusiers) - the two frigates of this class were intended to be privateers that were purchased by the French Navy after their launch.
  - Rohan Soubise, (launched in 1779 at Dunkerque as Comtess d'Artois) - renamed after purchase, captured by the British in 1781.
  - Robecq, (launched in 1779 at Dunkerque as Comtesse de Provence) - renamed after purchase, captured by the British in 1782 and renamed Robecque.

=== 12-pounder armed frigates ===
- Nymphe class, (32-gun design by Pierre-Augustin Lamothe, with 26 × 12-pounder and 6 × 6-pounder guns).
  - Nymphe, (launched 18 August 1777 at Brest) – captured by British Navy 19 August 1780 off Ushant and became HMS Nymphe.
  - Andromaque, (launched 24 December 1777 at Brest) – wrecked to avoid capture 22 August 1796 near Arcachon.
  - Astrée, (launched 16 May 1780 at Brest) – lost without trace in the Indian Ocean 1795.

Thétis, Cybèle, and Concorde, were built on the same pattern, but armed with 18-pounders.

- Sibylle class, (32-gun design by Jacques-Noël Sané, with 26 × 12-pounder and 6 × 6-pounder guns).
  - Sibylle, (launched 30 August 1777 at Brest) – captured by the British Navy 22 January 1783 in Chesapeake Bay.
  - Diane, (launched 18 January 1779 at Saint-Malo) – wrecked 1780.
  - Néréide, (launched 31 May 1779 at Saint-Malo) – captured by the British Navy 22 December 1797 off the Sciilies.
  - Fine, (launched 11 August 1779 at Nantes) – wrecked 1794.
  - Émeraude, (launched 25 October 1779 at Nantes) – broken up 1797.
- Charmante class, (32-gun design by Jean-Denis Chevillard, with 26 × 12-pounder and 6 × 6-pounder guns).
  - Charmante, (launched 30 August 1777 at Brest) – wrecked 1780.
  - Junon, (launched March 1778 at Rochefort) – wrecked 9 October 1780 on Dominica.
  - Gracieuse, (launched 19 May 1787 at Rochefort) – captured by British Navy 1796.
  - Inconstante, (launched 8 September 1790 at Rochefort) – captured by British Navy 25 November 1793 off San Domingo.
  - Hélène, (launched 18 May 1791 at Rochefort) – captured by Spanish Navy 1793.
- Concorde class, (32-gun design by Henri Chevillard, with 26 × 12-pounder and 6 × 6-pounder guns).
  - Concorde, (launched 3 September 1777 at Rochefort) – captured by British Navy 15 February 1783.
  - Courageuse, (launched 28 February 1778 at Rochefort) – captured by British Navy 18 June 1799 in Mediterranean.
  - Hermione, (launched 28 April 1779 at Rochefort) – wrecked 1793.
- Fortunée, (one-off 32-gun design by Pierre Forfait, with 26 × 12-pounder and 6 × 6-pounder guns, launched 26 December 1777 at Brest) – captured by British Navy 22 December 1779.
- Iphigénie class, (32-gun design by Léon-Michel Guignace, with 26 × 12-pounder and 6 × 6-pounder guns; Up to 6 × 36-pounder obusiers were later added).
  - Iphigénie, (launched 16 October 1777 at Lorient) – captured by Spanish Navy 10 February 1795 in Mediterranean.
  - Surveillante, (launched 26 March 1778 at Lorient) – wrecked or scuttled in Bantry Bay January 1797.
  - Résolue, (launched 16 March 1778 at St Malo) – captured by British Navy 13 October 1798 North of Ireland.
  - Gentille, (launched 18 June 1778 at St Malo) – captured by British Navy 11 April 1795 in the Channel.
  - Amazone, (launched 11 May 1778 at St Malo) – captured by British Navy 1782 but retaken next day; wrecked 1797.
  - Prudente, (launched late March 1778 at St Malo) – captured by British Navy 2 June 1779 in West Indies.
  - Gloire, (launched 9 July 1778 at St Malo) – captured by British Navy 10 April 1795 in Channel.
  - Bellone, (launched 2 August 1778 at St Malo) – captured by British Navy 12 October 1798 off Ireland.
  - Médée, (launched 23 September 1778 at St Malo) – captured by British East Indiamen 1800.
- Magicienne class, (32-gun design by Joseph-Marie-Blaise Coulomb, with 26 × 12-pounder and 6 × 6-pounder guns).
  - Magicienne, (launched 1 August 1778 at Toulon) – captured by British Navy on 2 September 1781 in North America.
  - Précieuse, (launched 22 August 1778 at Toulon) – hulked November 1794, then deleted October 1814.
  - Sérieuse, (launched 28 August 1779 at Toulon) – sunk at the Battle of Aboukir, 1 August 1798.
  - Lutine, (launched 11 September 1779 at Toulon) – captured by British Navy at Toulon 29 August 1793 – became HMS Lutine and was wrecked in October 1799, her ship's bell was salvaged and still hangs in Lloyd's of London.
  - Vestale, (launched 14 October 1780 at Toulon) – captured by British Navy off Rochefort 20 August 1799.
  - Alceste, (launched 28 October 1780 at Toulon) – captured 29 August 1793 by British Navy at Toulon and given to Sardinia after the evacuation of that port, retaken by the French Boudeuse, on 8 June 1794, then captured again by the British Navy on 18 June 1799 in the Mediterranean.
  - Iris, (launched 29 October 1781 at Toulon) – captured 29 August 1793 by British Navy at Toulon and burnt 18 December 1793 during evacuation.
  - Réunion, (launched 23 February 1786 at Toulon) – captured by British Navy off Cherbourg 20 October 1793.
  - Modeste, (launched 18 March 1786 at Toulon) – captured by British Navy at Genoa 17 October 1793.
  - Sensible, (launched 29 August 1787 at Toulon) – captured by British Navy off Malta 27 June 1798.
  - Topaze, (launched 26 September 1790 at Toulon) – captured by British Navy 29 August 1793 at Toulon.
  - Artémise, (launched 25 September 1794 at Toulon) – sunk at the Battle of Aboukir, 1 August 1798.
- Cérès class (32-gun design by Charles-Etienne Bombelle, with 26 × 12-pounder and 6 × 6-pounder guns).
  - Cérès, (launched 24 November 1779 at Rochefort) – demolished 1787.
  - Fée, (launched 19 April 1780 at Rochefort) – demolished 1790.
- Espérance, (32-gun design of 1778, purchased on the stocks and launched at Bordeaux in the end of 1779; armament 26 × 12-pounders and 6 × 6-pounders) - captured by the British frigate HMS Pearl on 30 September 1780, becoming HMS Clinton.
- Galathée class, (32-gun design by Raymond-Antoine Haran, with 26 × 12-pounder and 6 × 6-pounder guns).
  - Galathée, (launched 28 June 1779 at Rochefort).
  - Railleuse, (launched 11 August 1779 at Bordeaux); she was sold on 17 January 1798 at Rochefort. She became the privateer Egyptienne, which HMS Hippomenes, captured on 25 March 1804. The British took Egyptienne into service as HMS Antigua. Antigua served as a prison ship until she was scrapped in 1816.
  - Fleur de Lys (launched 2 December 1785 at Rochefort) – renamed Pique in June 1792 – captured by British Navy 6 January 1795 in West Indies and named HMS Pique.
- Capricieuse class, (32-gun design by Charles Segondat-Duvernet, with 26 × 12-pounder and 6 × 6-pounder guns).
  - Capricieuse, (i) (launched 23 December 1779 at Lorient) – captured 5 July 1780 by British Navy and burnt.
  - Friponne, (launched 20 March 1780 at Lorient) – condemned 1796.
  - Capricieuse, (ii) (launched 20 November 1786 at Lorient ( – wrecked January 1800.
  - Prudente, (launched 21 September 1790 at Lorient) – sold for service as a privateer 1798. captured by British Navy 9 February 1799, Cape of Good Hope. Not added to Royal Navy
- Vénus class (32-gun design by Jacques-Noël Sané, with 26 × 12-pounder and 6 × 6-pounder guns).
  - Vénus, (launched 6 March 1780 at St Malo) – wrecked 1781.
  - Cléopâtre, (launched 19 August 1781 at St Malo) – captured by British Navy 18 June 1793 off Start, renamed HMS Oiseau.
- Félicité class, (32-gun design by Pierre-Alexandre Forfait, with 26 × 12-pounder and 6 × 6-pounder guns, and 2 × 36-pounder obusiers de vaisseaux).
  - Félicité, 34 guns (launched 4 August 1785 at Brest) – captured by British Navy 18 June 1809, sold to Haiti and commissioned as the Améthyste, defected 1812 to Haitian rebels and renamed Heureuse Réunion, retaken by British & returned to Haiti.
  - Calypso, 32 guns (launched 2 December 1785 at Brest) – transferred to Spain 1793.
  - Fidèle, 32 guns (launched 22 July 1789 at Le Havre) – condemned 1802, probably demolished 1813.
  - Fortunée, 32 guns (launched 28 September 1791 at Le Havre) – burnt 19 February 1794 at San Fiorenzo to avoid capture.
- Proselite, (one-off 32-gun design by Charles-Louis Ducrest, with 26 × 12-pounder and 6 × 6-pounder guns, launched February 1786 at Le Havre) – captured by British Navy August 1793.
- Aglaé, (one-off 32-gun design by Pierre Duhamel, with 26 × 12-pounder and 6 × 6-pounder guns, launched 7 May 1788 at Rochefort) – got her hull coppered and renamed Fraternité in 1793, lost with all hands in the Atlantic Ocean in September 1802.
- Embuscade, (34-gun design of 1788 by Honoré-Sébastien Vial du Clairbois, initially with 26 × 12-pounders and 6 × 6-pounders and 2 36-pounder obusiers, in 1794 the quarterdeck and forecastle were armed with 10 × 6-pounders (36 guns in all), in 1796 4 of the 6-pounders were switched with 36-pounder obusiers; launched on 25 November 1789 at Lorient) - captured by the British on 12 October 1798 off Donegal and renamed HMS Ambuscade.
- Sémillante class, (32-gun design by Pierre-Joseph Pénétreau, with 26 × 12-pounder and 6 × 6-pounder guns).
  - Sémillante, 32 guns (launched 25 November 1791 at Lorient) – sold in September 1808 for commercial use.
  - Insurgente, 32 guns (launched 27 April 1793 at Lorient – captured by American Navy in February 1799, becoming USS Insurgent.
- Charente Inférieure class (32-gun design by Raymond-Antoine Haran, with 26 × 12-pounder and 6 × 6-pounder guns).
  - Charente Inférieure, (launched 30 June 1793 at Rochefort) – renamed Tribune in February 1794 – captured by British Navy 9 June 1796 off Ireland, becoming HMS Tribune.
  - République Française, (launched 3 January 1794 at Bordeaux) – renamed Républicaine Française in September 1794, then Renommée in May 1795 – captured by British Navy 13 June 1796 at San Domingo, becoming HMS Renommee.
  - Décade Française, (launched 10 October 1794 at Bordeaux) – renamed Décade in May 1795 – captured by British Navy 23 August 1798 off Cape Finisterre, becoming HMS Decade.
- Cocarde Nationale class, (40-gun design by Pierre Duhamel, with 28 × 12-pounder and 12 × 6-pounder guns).
  - Cocarde Nationale, (launched 29 April 1794 at St Malo) – renamed Cocarde in June 1796; deleted 14 June 1803.
  - Régénérée, (launched 1 November 1794 at St Malo) – captured by British Navy 27 November 1801, renamed HMS Alexandria.
  - Bravoure, (launched November 1795 at Saint-Servan) – wrecked 1 September 1801 near Livorno to avoid capture by the British Navy.
- Patriote (Coquille) class, (40-gun design by Raymond-Antoine Haran, with 28 × 12-pounder and 12 × 6-pounder guns).
  - Patriote (launched October 1794 at Bayonne) – renamed Coquille on 30 May 1795.
  - Fidèle (launched 1795 at Bayonne) – renamed Sirène on 30 May 1795.
  - Franchise, (launched 17 October 1797 at Bayonne) - captured by British Navy on 28 May 1803 in Channel became HMS Franchise.
  - Dédaigneuse, (launched December 1797 at Bayonne) - taken by the British on 28 January 1801 off Portugal, keeping her name.
  - Thémis, (launched 13 August 1799 at Bayonne).
- Heureuse class (38-gun design by Pierre Degay, with 26 × 12-pounder and 12 × 6-pounder guns).
  - Heureuse, (launched 31 January 1798 at Basse-Indre, near Nantes).
  - Chiffonne, (launched 31 August 1799 at Basse-Indre, near Nantes).
- Psyché, (one-off 42-gun design by Pierre Degay, with 24 × 12-pounder and 18 × 6-pounder guns, launched 1798 as a privateer at Nantes and purchased 1804 by French Navy) – captured by British Navy 14 February 1805 off India.

12-pounder frigates captured or purchased by the French Navy 1774 – 1815.

- Fox, 28 (1773, ex-British privateer Fox, captured 1778) – sold 1778 (not added to French Navy).
- Bellone, 36 (1788, ex-Venetian Bellona, captured May 1797) – destroyed December 1797.
- Lonato ex-Palme, 36, (1784, ex-Venetian Palma, captured July 1797) – captured at Corfu by the Russians in March 1799.
- Léoben ex-Méduse, 36, (1788, ex-Venetian Medusa, captured July 1797) – captured at Alexandria by the British Navy in September 1801.
- Mantoue ex-Céres, 32, (1794, ex-Venetian Cerere, captured July 1797) – captured at Alexandria by the British Navy in September 1801.
- Montenotte ex-Brillante, 32, (1788, ex-Venetian Brillante, captured July 1797) – taken to pieces at Alexandria in May 1801.
- Pallas, 30, (1786, ex-Venetian Pallade, captured May 1797) – destroyed 1797.
- Bérouse, 36/40, (c. 1764, ex-Maltese Santa Maria del Pilar, captured June 1798) – taken to pieces 1798.
- Carthagenoise, 40 (1782, ex-Maltese Santa Elizabetta, captured June 1798) – Captured by Britain on 4 September 1800, then taken to pieces.
- Embuscade, 32, (1773, ex-British HMS Ambuscade, captured in the action of 14 December 1798) – Recaptured by British Navy on 28 May 1803 in Atlantic.
- Avtroil 32 (ex-Russian, captured October 1809, ex-Swedish Avtrolle, captured August 1789).

The above list excludes some 12-pounder frigates captured from the British Navy at various dates, or from other navies.

=== 18-pounder armed frigates ===
Until 1779 the standard armament on the frigate was the 12-pounder gun, but in that year Britain and France independently developed heavy frigates with a main battery of either 26 or 28 × 18-pounder guns (plus a number of smaller guns, usually 8-pounders or 6-pounders, on the gaillards – the French term for the quarterdeck and forecastle combined). From 1786 the standard designs of Jacques-Noël Sané became predominant and – while other classes of frigate were built – Sané designs were used for the vast majority of frigates built thereafter up to 1814.

- Aigle, (36- or 40-gun privateer frigate design of 1779 by Jacques-Noël Sané, with 26 × 18-pounders and 10 or 14 × 8-pounders; launched on 11 February 1780 at Saint-Malo, purchased by the French Navy in April 1782) - wrecked in combat on the Delaware River in September 1782, refloated by the British and taken into the Navy as HMS Aigle.
- Nymphe class, (36/38-gun design by Pierre-Augustin Lamothe, with 26 × 18-pdr guns initially, although by 1793 carried 28 × 18-pdr guns, plus 10 × 8-pdr guns on the gaillards and 4 obusiers).
  - Nymphe, 36 guns (launched 30 May 1782 at Brest) – wrecked at Noirmoutiers 30 December 1793.
  - Thétis, 36 guns (launched 16 June 1788 at Brest) – captured by British Navy 10 November 1808 off Lorient, becoming HMS Brune.
  - Cybèle, 36 guns (launched 7 July 1789 at Brest) – sunk in action 24 February 1809 at Sables d'Olonne.
  - Concorde, 36 guns (launched 25 October 1791 at Brest) – captured by British Navy 4 August 1800.
- Hébé class, (36/38-gun design by Jacques-Noël Sané, with 26 × 18-pdr guns initially, although by 1793 carried 28 × 18-pdr guns, plus 10 × 8-pdr guns on the gaillards and 4 obusiers).
  - Hébé, 38 guns (launched 25 June 1782 at Saint-Malo) – captured by British Navy 4 September 1782 off Ile Bas.
  - Vénus, 38 guns (launched 14 July 1782 at Brest) – wrecked 31 December 1788 in the Indian Ocean.
  - Dryade, 40 guns (launched 3 February 1783 at Saint-Malo) – condemned 1801 and BU.
  - Proserpine, 40 guns (launched 25 June 1785 at Brest) – captured by British Navy 13 June 1796 off Cape Clear, becoming HMS Amelia.
  - Sibylle, 40 guns (launched 30 August 1791 at Toulon) – captured by British Navy 17 June 1794 at Miconi, Mediterranean.
  - Carmagnole, 40 guns (launched 22 May 1793 at Brest) – wrecked at Vlissingen 9 November 1800.
- Danaé class, (36/38-gun design by Charles Segonday-Duvernet, with 26 × 18-pdr guns initially, although by 1793 carried 28 × 18-pdr guns, plus 10 × 8-pdr guns on the gaillards and 4 obusiers).) The Danaé, the prototype, differed somewhat from the other pair).
  - Danaé, 38 guns (launched 27 May 1782 at Lorient) – deleted 1796 or later.
  - Méduse, 38 guns (launched 18 November 1782 at Lorient) – burnt by accident 1797.
  - Didon, 38 guns (launched 20 August 1785 at Lorient) – burnt at Guadeloupe 1792.
- Minerve class, (36/38-gun design by Joseph-Marie-Blaise Coulomb, the first two with 26 × 18-pdr guns, although by 1793, Impérieuse had two extra gunports cut in the bows and then carried 28 × 18-pdr guns, plus 10 × 8-pdr guns on the gaillards and 4 obusiers).
  - Minerve, 36 guns (launched 31 July 1782 at Toulon) – captured by British Navy February 1794, becoming HMS San Fiorenzo.
  - Junon, 38 guns (launched 14 August 1782 at Toulon) – captured by British Navy June 1799, becoming HMS Princess Charlotte.
  - Impérieuse, 40 guns (launched 11 July 1787 at Toulon – Captured by Britain 1793, becoming HMS Imperieuse, renamed HMS Unité in September 1803.
- modified Minerve class (same dimensions as before, but with an additional gun port in each broadside)
  - Melpomène, 40 guns (launched 6 August 1789 at Toulon) – captured by British Navy February 1794, becoming HMS Melpomene.
  - Perle, 40 guns (launched 27 August 1790 at Toulon) – captured by British Navy in December 1793, becoming HMS Amethyst.
- modified (enlarged) Minerve class (lengthened by 7 pieds (French feet), broadened by 1.5 pieds and with 4 pouces (French inch) more depth in hold)
  - Minerve, 40 (launched 4 September 1794 at Toulon) – Captured by Britain 1795, becoming HMS Minerve, recaptured by France in 1803 and renamed Canonnière, sold for commerce at the Île de France in June 1809, again captured by Britain in February 1810, but not re-enlisted.
- Pomone, (40-gun one-off design by Charles-Etienne Bombelle, with 28 × 18-pounder and 12 × 8-pounder guns, plus 4 × 36-pounder obusiers) launched 16 November 1785 at Rochefort – captured by the British Navy 23 April 1794, becoming HMS Pomone.
- Pénélope, (40-gun one-off design by Jacques-Noel Sané, with 28 × 18-pounder and 12 × 8-pounder guns) launched 30 October 1788 at Brest – wrecked October 1788 in South Africa.
- Uranie, (40-gun one-off design by Pierre Ozanne and Leon-Michel Guignace, with 28 × 18-pounder and 12 × 8-pounder guns) launched 30 October 1788 at Lorient – renamed Tartu in November 1793, captured by the British Navy 31 December 1796 off Ireland, becoming HMS Uranie.
- Aréthuse, (38-gun one-off design by Charles Segondat-Duvernet with 28 × 18-pounder and 10 × 8-pounder guns, and 4 × 24-pounder carronades) launched 3 March 1791 at Brest – captured by the British Navy 29 August 1793 at Toulon, becoming HMS Undaunted.
- Vertu, (40-gun design by Charles Segondat) – captured by British Navy 30 November 1803 at Cape Francois, Haiti, becoming HMS Virtue.
- Seine class, (38-gun design by Pierre-Alexandre Forfait, with 28 × 18-pounder and 10 × 8-pdr guns, plus 4 × 36-pounder obusiers).
  - Seine, (launched 1793 at Le Havre) – captured by British Navy 30 June 1798 in Channel, became HMS Seine.
  - Révolutionnaire, (launched 1794 at Le Havre) – captured by British Navy 21 October 1794 off Brest, became HMS Revolutionnaire.
  - Spartiate, (launched 1794 at Le Havre) – renamed Pensée in May 1795.
  - Indienne, (launched 1796 at Le Havre) – burnt 12 April 1809 Battle of Basque Roads.
  - Furieuse, (launched 1797 at Cherbourg).
- Loire, (one-off 38/44-gun design by Pierre Degay with 26 × 18-pdr. and 12 × 8-pdr. guns, later plus 6 × 36-pdr. obusiers) - launched 1796 at Nantes; captured by Britain on 18 October 1798 off Ireland and taken into the Royal Navy as HMS Loire
- Valeureuse class, (38-gun design by Pierre-Alexandre Forfait, with 28 × 18-pounder and 10 × 8-pdr guns, plus 4 × 36-pounder obusiers; these were originally ordered to the design of the Seine class, but were slightly lengthened by the constructor, Charles-Henri Le Tellier).
  - Valeureuse, (launched 29 July 1798 at Le Havre) – damaged in a storm 1806 and sold.
  - Infatigable, 40 (launched 6 April 1799 at Le Havre) – Captured by Britain 25 September 1806 off Rochefort, renamed Immortalité.
- Montagne, (one-off design by Joseph-Marie-Blaise Coulomb) – launched 26 June 1794 at Rochefort; renamed Volontaire on 10 July 1794; wrecked 22 August 1794 near Penmarck to avoid capture by the Royal Navy, and destroyed the following day.
- Virginie class, (40-gun design by Jacques-Noël Sané, with 28 × 18-pounder and 12 × 8-pounder guns, plus 4 × 36-pounder obusiers).
  - Virginie, (launched 1794 at Brest) – captured by British Navy 1795, becoming HMS Virginie.
  - Courageuse, (launched 1794 at Brest) – renamed Justice in April 1795 – captured by British Navy 2 September 1801 at Alexandria, then handed over to Turks.
  - Harmonie, (launched 1795 at Bordeaux) - burnt by her crew to avoid capture by the British off le Marigot on 17 April 1797.
  - Volontaire, (launched 1796 at Bordeaux) – captured by British Navy 4 March 1806 at Cape of Good Hope, becoming HMS Volontaire.
  - Cornélie, (launched 1797 at Brest) – captured by Spanish Navy 14 June 1808 at Cadiz.
  - Didon, (launched 1799 at St Malo) – captured by British Navy 10 August 1805 off Cape Finisterre, becoming HMS Didon.
  - Rhin, (launched 1802 at Toulon) – captured by British Navy 27 July 1806 off Rochefort, becoming HMS Rhin.
  - Belle Poule, (launched 1802 at Basse-Indre) – captured by British Navy 13 March 1806 in South Atlantic, becoming HMS Belle Poule.
  - Surveillante, (launched 1802 at Basse-Indre) – captured by British Navy 30 November 1803 at Cape Francois, Haiti, becoming HMS Surveillante.
  - Atalante, (launched 1802 at St Malo) – December 1805 burnt by the British at the Cape of Good Hope during the attack on Cape Town.
- Preneuse class, (40-gun design of 1794 by Raymond-Antoine Haran, with 28 × 18-pounder and 12 × 8-pounder guns).
  - Preneuse, (launched 1794 at Rochefort) – destroyed by British Navy 11 December 1799 at Port Louis.
  - Africaine, (launched 1798 at Rochefort) – captured by British Navy 19 February 1801 in Mediterranean, becoming HMS Africaine.
- Diane, 40-gun one-off design by Pierre-Joseph Pénétreau (launched 10 February 1796 at Toulon) – Captured by Britain 24 August 1800 off Malta, becoming HMS Niobe.
- Armide class, (40-gun design by Pierre Roland, with 28 × 18-pounder and 8 × 12-pounder guns and 4 × 36-pounder obusiers).
  - Armide, (launched 24 April 1804 at Rochefort) – captured by British Navy 25 September 1806 off Rochefort, becoming HMS Armide.
  - Minerve, (launched 9 September 1805 at Rochefort) – captured by British Navy 25 September 1806 off Rochefort, becoming HMS Alceste.
  - Pénélope, (launched 28 October 1806 at Bordeaux) – deleted 1826.
  - Flore, (launched 11 November 1806 at Rochefort) – wrecked 1811 in the Adriatic.
  - Amphitrite, (launched 11 April 1808 at Cherbourg) – burnt 4 February 1809 during attack on Martinique.
  - Niémen, (launched 8 November 1808 at Bordeaux) – captured by British Navy 5 April 1809 in Bay of Biscay, becoming HMS Niemen.
  - Saale, (launched 28 October 1810 at Rochefort) – renamed Amphitrite September 1814, reverted to Saale March 1815, then Amphitrite again in July 1815 – deleted 1821.
  - Alcmène, (launched 3 October 1811 at Cherbourg) – captured by British Navy 16 January 1814 off Madeira, becoming HMS Dunira, but quickly renamed HMS Immortalite.
  - Circé, (launched 15 December 1811 at Rochefort) – deleted 1844.
- Three more of this design – Androméde, Emeraude and Cornélie – were begun at Bayonne but never reached launch stage, while three more were completed post-war:
  - Antigone (launched 14 March 1816 at Bordeaux) – deleted 3 August 1829.
  - Cléopâtre (launched 1 April 1817 at Cherbourg) – deleted 30 September 1823.
  - Magicienne (launched 11 April 1823 at Rochefort) – deleted 29 November 1840.
- Carrère class, (40-gun design by Pierre-Alexandre Forfait, with 28 × 18-pounder and 12 × 8-pdr guns, plus 4 × 36-pounder obusiers).
  - Carrère, (launched 20 August 1797 at Venice) – captured by British Navy on 3 August 1801off Elba, becoming HMS Carrere.
  - Muiron, (launched 22 August 1797 at Venice) – hulked 1807, deleted 1850.
- Créole, (40-gun one-off design by Jacques-Augustin Lamothe with 28 × 18-pounder and 12 × 8-pounder guns) launched 24 June 1797 at Basse-Indre – captured by the British Navy 28 June 1803 off San Domingo, becoming HMS Creole.
- Pallas, (design by Pierre-Alexandre Forfait and modified by François Pestel; originally intended as a "Frégate bombarde" armed with 24-pounders but was then changed to an 18-pounder frigate with 26 × 18-pounder and 14 × 8-pounder guns plus two "obusiers", naval howitzers) - launched 1798 at Saint-Malo; Captured by Britain on 2 February 1800 off the French coast and taken into service as HMS Pique.
- Guerrière, (design by Pierre-Alexandre Forfait modified by Jean-François Lafosse; she was modified from the plans of the 24-pounder frigate Romaine to carry 28 × 18-pdrs, 16 × 8-pdrs and 4 × 36-pdr obusiers) - launched 15 September 1799 at Cherbourg; captured by Britain on 19 July 1806 off Faroe Isles, she is best known for her fight with USS Constitution in 1812.
- Uranie class, (40-gun design of 1797 by Jean-François Gautier, with 28 × 18-pounder and 12 × 8-pounder guns; both ships built by Pierre Degay and Entreprise Crucy at Basse-Indre, near Nantes).
  - Uranie, (launched 30 October 1800 at Basse-Indre) – burnt 3 February 1814 at Brindisi to avoid capture by the British Navy.
  - Clorinde, (launched 31 October 1800 at Basse-Indre) – captured by the British Navy 30 November 1803 at Cape Francois, Haiti, becoming HMS Clorinde.
- Gloire class, (40-gun design of 1802 by Pierre-Alexandre Forfait, with 28 × 18-pounder and 12 × 8-pounder guns).
  - Gloire, (launched 20 July 1803 at Basse-Indre) – captured by the British Navy 25 September 1806 in the Channel, becoming HMS Gloire.
  - Président, (launched 4 June 1804 at Basse-Indre) – captured by the British Navy 27 September 1806 in the Atlantic, becoming HMS President.
  - Topaze, (launched 1 March 1805 at Basse-Indre) – captured by the British Navy 22 January 1809 off Guadeloupe, becoming HMS Alcmene.
  - Vénus, (launched 5 April 1806 at Le Havre) – captured by the British Navy 18 September 1810 off Reunion, becoming HMS Nereide.
  - Junon, (launched 16 August 1806 at Le Havre) – captured by the British Navy on 10 February 1809 in West Indies, becoming HMS Junon, retaken and scuttled by the French off Guadaloupe in December of the same year.
  - Calypso, (launched 9 January 1807 at Lorient) – severely damaged 1809, sold 1813 or 1814.
  - Amazone, (launched 20 July 1807 at Le Havre) – burnt by the British Navy 25 March 1811 near Barfleur.
- Consolante class, (40-gun design by François Pestel, with 28 × 18-pounder and 12 × 8-pounder guns).
  - Consolante, (launched 22 July 1800 at Saint-Malo).
  - Piémontaise, (launched 15 November 1804 at Saint-Servan) - taken by HMS San Fiorenzo off Ceylon on 8 March 1808 and put into service as HMS Piedmontaise.
  - Italienne, (launched 15 August 1806 at Saint-Servan).
  - Danaé, (launched 18 August 1807 at Genoa).
  - Bellone, (launched February 1808 at Saint-Servan) - captured by the British Navy at the fall of Île de France (Mauritius), 6 December 1810, and renamed HMS Junon.
  - Néréide, (launched December 1808 at Saint-Servan) - taken by the British at the seizure of Réunion, September 1809, renamed HMS Madagascar.
  - Illyrienne, (launched 13 November 1811 at Saint-Servan).
  - Galatée, (launched 5 May 1812 at Genoa).
- Hermione, (one-off design by Antoine Geoffroy; launched 15 November 1803 at Lorient, renamed Ville de Milan 1804) – captured by Britain on 23 February 1805 and renamed HMS Milan.
- Milanaise class, (40-gun design by Charles Segondat, with 28 × 18-pounder and 12 × 8-pounder guns).
  - Milanaise, (launched 23 September 1805 at Dunkirk) – renamed Sirène in August 1814; deleted 1836.
  - Vistule, (launched 23 August 1808 at Dunkirk) – renamed Danaé in August 1814; deleted 1819.
  - Oder, (launched 14 July 1813 at Dunkirk) – renamed Thémis August 1814, reverted to Oder March 1815, then Thémis again July 1815; deleted 1831.
  - Perle, (launched 13 August 1813 at Dunkirk) – deleted August 1823.
- Hortense class, (40-gun design of 1802 by Jacques-Noël Sané, with 28 × 18-pounder and 12 × 8-pounder guns).
  - Hortense, (launched 3 July 1803 at Toulon) – broken up 1840.
  - Hermione, (launched 2 December 1804 at Toulon) – run aground near Brest and then burnt by the British Navy in 1808.
  - Pomone, (launched 10 February 1805 at Genoa) – captured by British Navy 29 November 1811 in the Adriatic, becoming HMS Ambuscade.
  - Manche, (launched 5 April 1806 at Cherbourg) – captured by British Navy 6 December 1810 at fall of Mauritius, but not added to RN.
  - Caroline, (launched 15 August 1806 at Antwerp) – captured by British Navy 21 September 1809 at Ile Bourbon, becoming HMS Bourbonnaise.
  - Pauline, (launched 18 April 1807 at Toulon) – renamed Bellone April 1814.
  - Corona, (also known as Couronne, launched 27 December 1807 at Venice) – captured by British Navy 13 March 1811 at the Battle of Lissa, becoming HMS Daedalus.
- Pallas class, (40-gun design of 1805 by Jacques-Noël Sané on basis of the Hortense class, with 28 × 18-pounder and 12 × 8-pounder guns). This was the 'standard' frigate design of the French First Empire, numerically outweighing all other types.
  - Pallas, (launched 9 April 1808 at Basse-Indre) - deleted in 1822.
  - Elbe, (launched 23 May 1808 at Basse-Indre) – renamed Calypso 30 August 1814; hulked 1825; demolished probably in 1841.
  - Renommée, (launched 21 August 1808 at Basse-Indre) – captured by British Navy 20 May 1811 off Madagascar, becoming HMS Java.
  - Amélie, (launched 21 July 1808 at Toulon) – renamed Junon April 1814; "en flûte" 1837; deleted from the navy list 1842.
  - Clorinde, (launched 8 August 1808 at Paimboeuf) – captured by British Navy 26 February 1814 near Galway, becoming HMS Aurora.
  - Elisa, (launched 1808 at Le Havre) – wrecked 23 December 1810.
  - Favorita, (launched 4 October 1808 at Venice for subsidiary "Italian" Navy) – to French Navy itself April 1810, renamed Favorite, burnt and destroyed by explosion at the Battle of Lissa on 13 March 1811.
  - Astrée, (launched 1809 at Cherbourg) – captured by British Navy 6 December 1810 at fall of Mauritius, becoming HMS Pomone.
  - Fidèle, (launched 1809 at Flushing after capture on stocks) – captured by British Navy 16 August 1809, becoming HMS Laurel.
  - Adrienne, (launched 1809 at Toulon) – renamed Aurore April 1814, then Dauphine September 1829 but reverted to Aurore August 1830; deleted 1848.
  - Nymphe, (launched 1810 at Basse-Indre); hulked 1832; taken apart 1873.
  - Iphigénie, (launched 1810 at Cherbourg) – captured by British Navy 16 January 1814 off Madeira, renamed HMS Palma, but shortly after becoming HMS Gloire.
  - Méduse, (launched 1810 at Paimboeuf) – wrecked 1816.
  - Pregel, (launched 1810 at St Malo) – renamed Eurydice August 1814; taken apart at Brest in 1825.
  - Ariane, (launched 1811 at Basse-Indre) – burnt to avoid capture in the action of 22 May 1812.
  - Médée, (launched 1811 at Genoa)- renamed Muiron 1850; foundered at Toulon in 1882.
  - Andromaque, (launched 1811 at Basse-Indre) – burnt to avoid capture in the action of 22 May 1812.
  - Yssel, (launched 1811 at Amsterdam, named Ijssel by the Dutch) – handed over to new Dutch Navy 1814; deleted in 1826.
  - Carolina, (launched 1811 at Naples) - .
  - Principessa di Bologna, (ordered 1810 at Venice for subsidiary "Italian" Navy) – to French Navy itself April 1810, renamed Princesse de Bologne and launched 1811 – captured by the Austrian Navy April 1814 at the fall of Venice.
  - Gloire, (launched 1811 at Le Havre) - condemned in 1822 and broken up at Brest.
  - Meuse, (launched 1811 at Amsterdam) – handed over to new Dutch Navy 1814 and renamed Maas; demolished in 1816.
  - Terpsichore, (launched 1812 at Antwerp) – captured by British Navy 3 Feb 1814 in the Atlantic, becoming HMS Modeste.
  - Érigone, (launched 1812 at Antwerp) - demolished at Brest 1825.
  - Aréthuse, (launched 1812 at Paimboeuf) - razeed to corvette in 1834; condemned and sold for demolition in 1851.
  - Jahde, (launched 1812 at Rotterdam) – renamed Psyché August 1814; deleted 1822.
  - Trave, (launched 1812 at Amsterdam) – captured by British Navy 23 October 1813 in the Atlantic, becoming HMS Trave.
  - Weser, (launched 1812 at Amsterdam) – captured by British Navy 21 October 1813 off Ushant, becoming HMS Weser.
  - Melpomene, (launched 1812 at Toulon) – captured by British Navy 30 April 1815 off Ischia, becoming HMS Melpomene.
  - Rubis, (launched 1812 at Basse-Indre) – wrecked 5 February 1813 in the Los Islands.
  - Ems, (launched 1812 at Rotterdam) – renamed Africaine August 1814; wrecked in 1822.
  - Atalante, (started as the Euridyce, launched 1812 at Lorient) – renamed Duchesse d'Angoulême July 1814; condemned and deleted in 1825.
  - Cérès, (launched 1812 at Brest) – captured by British Navy 6 January 1814 Cape Verde Islands, becoming HMS Seine.
  - Piave, (launched 1812 at Venice) - abandoned at the fall of Venice and taken by the Austrians; demolished in 1826.
  - Dryade, (launched 1812 at Genoa) – renamed Fleur de Lys in November 1814, reverted to Dryade March 1815 then Fleur de Lys again July 1815, finally Résolue August 1830; run aground and wrecked in a storm and demolished on site in 1833.
  - Sultane, (launched 30 May 1813 at Paimboeuf, near Nantes) – captured by British Navy 26 March 1814 off La Hogue, becoming HMS Sultane.
  - Étoile, (launched 28 July 1813 at Paimboeuf, near Nantes) – captured by British Navy 27 March 1814 off La Hogue, becoming HMS Topaze.
  - Rancune, (launched 30 September 1813 at Toulon) – renamed Néréide in August 1814; hulked in 1825.
  - Amphitrite, (launched 7 November 1815 at Venice) – seized by the Austrians at Venice's capture, becoming Austrian Navy's Anfitrite and later Augusta.
  - Amstel, (launched 13 September 1814 at Rotterdam) - captured by the Dutch on the stocks at the fall of Rotterdam.
  - Ambitieuse, (launched November 1814 at Amsterdam) - taken on the stocks by the Dutch at the evacuation of Amsterdam and renamed Koningin, later renamed Wilhelmina; deleted ca. 1821.
  - Immortelle, (launched November 1814 at Amsterdam) - taken on the stocks by the Dutch at the evacuation of Amsterdam and renamed Frederika Sophia Wilhelmina; deleted from the Dutch Navy List in 1819.
  - Vestale, (launched October 1816 at Rotterdam) - abandoned on the stocks by the retreating French; the Dutch recommenced construction, later renaming her Rhijn in 1828, hulked in 1853 and demolished in 1874.
  - Fidèle, (launched 22 November 1817) - abandoned on the stocks by the retreating French; the Dutch recommenced construction, renaming her Schelde; deleted in 1853.
  - Cybèle, (launched 11 April 1815 at Le Havre) – renamed Remise 1850.
  - Duchesse de Berry, (launched 25 August 1816 at Lorient) – renamed Victoire August 1830.
  - Constance, (launched 2 September 1818 at Brest) – hulked 1836, broken up after 1837.
  - Thétis, (launched 3 May 1819 at Toulon) – renamed Lanninon April 1865.
  - Astrée, (launched 28 April 1820 at Lorient).
  - Armide, (launched 1 May 1821 at Lorient).

18-pounder frigates captured by the French Navy.

- Succès, 32, (ex-British Success, captured 10 February 1801) – Retaken by British Navy 10 December 1801.
- Proserpine, (ex-British Proserpine, captured in the action of 27 February 1809). Taken to pieces 1865.
- Iphigenia, (ex-British Iphigenia, captured at the Battle of Grand Port in August 1810) – Retaken by British Navy December 1810.
- Néréide, (ex-British Nereide, recaptured at the Battle of Grand Port in August 1810; this was originally French Néreide which had been captured by British Navy in December 1797) – Retaken by British Navy December 1810.
- Ceylon, (ex-British Ceylon, originally Bombay, captured September 1810) – Retaken by British Navy the following day.

=== 24-pounder armed frigates ===
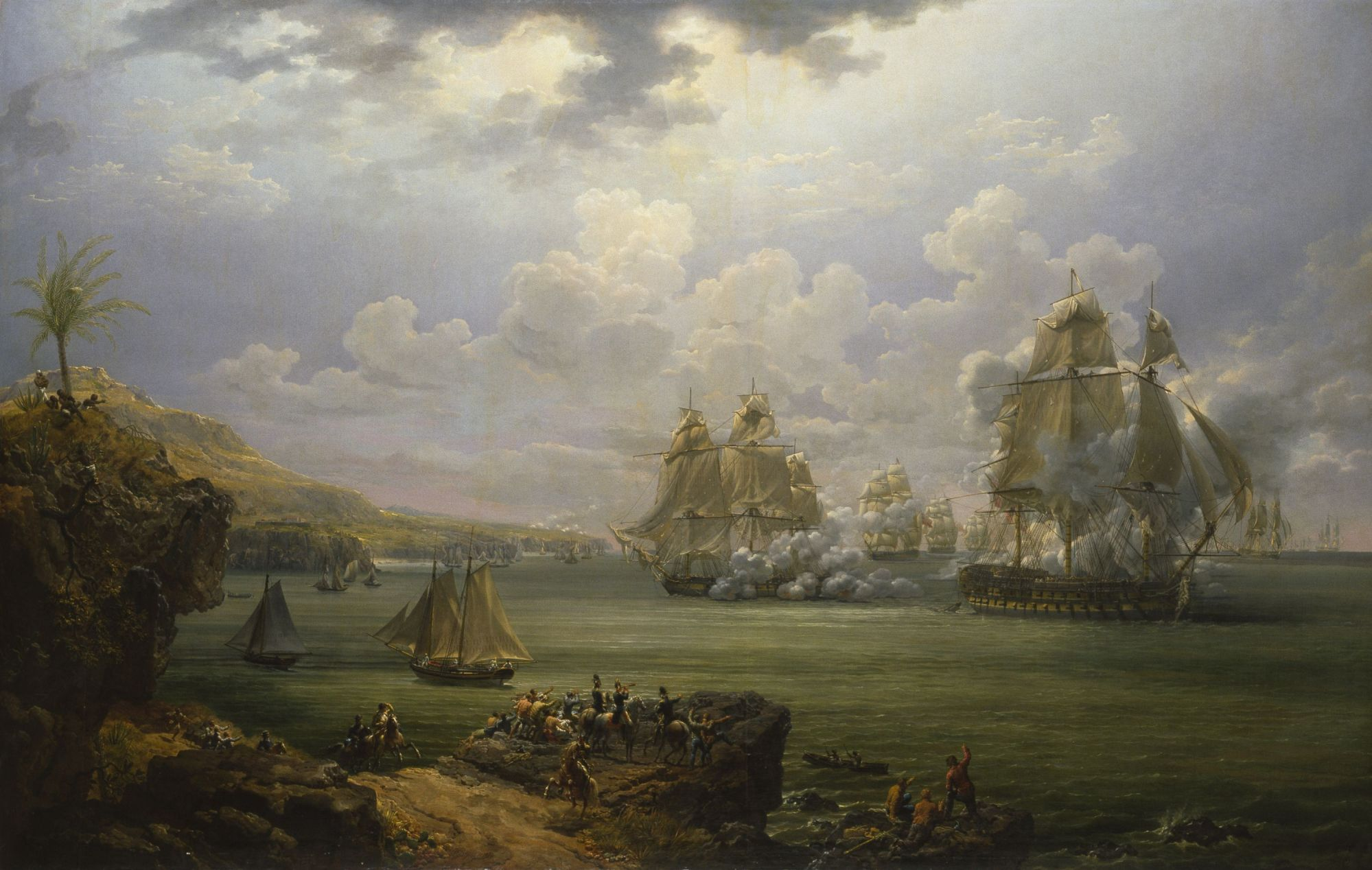
Fight of the Poursuivante – 28 June 1803, Louis-Philippe Crépin.

France experimented early with heavy frigates, with a pair being built in 1772 (however the 24-pounder guns of this pair were quickly replaced by 18-pounders in service). Several more were constructed during the French Revolution, but the Romaine class of "frégate-bombardes", to which curious design (incorporating a heavy mortar into the design) at least thirteen vessels were ordered (24 were originally planned), proved over-gunned, and no further 24-pounder armed frigates were begun until after 1815.

- Résistance class, (design by Pierre Degay, with 30 × 24-pounder guns and 20 × 12-pounder guns).
  - Vengeance, 50 (launched 8 November 1794 at Paimboeuf, Nantes) – captured by British Navy 25 August 1800 in the Mona Passage, becoming HMS Vengeance.
  - Résistance, 50 (launched 28 September 1795 at Paimboeuf, Nantes) – captured by British Navy 9 March 1797 off Brest, becoming HMS Fisgard.
- Forte class, (design by François Caro, with 30 × 24-pounder guns and 20 × 8-pounder guns).
  - Forte, 50 (launched 26 September 1794 at Lorient) – captured by the British Navy 28 February 1799 in the Bay of Bengal, becoming HMS Forte.
  - Egyptienne, 50 (launched 17 July 1799 at Toulon) – captured by British Navy 2 September 1801 at Alexandria, becoming HMS Egyptienne.
- Romaine class, (design by Pierre-Alexandre Forfait, initially given 20 × 24-pounder guns and a 12-inch mortar, although all those completed were later armed or re-armed with 18-pounder guns and no mortar).
  - Romaine, (launched 25 September 1794 at Le Havre).
  - Immortalité, (launched 7 January 1795 at Lorient) – captured by the British Navy 20 October 1798, becoming HMS Immortalite.
  - Impatiente, (launched 12 March 1795 at Lorient).
  - Incorruptible, (launched 20 May 1795 at Dieppe).
  - Revanche, (launched 31 August 1795 at Dieppe).
  - Libre, (launched 11 February 1796 at Le Havre). - captured by the British Navy 24 December 1805, not added to Royal Navy
  - Comète, (launched 11 March 1796 at Le Havre).
  - Désirée, (launched 23 April 1796 at Dunkirk) – captured by the British Navy 7 August 1800, at Dunkirk becoming HMS Desiree.
  - Poursuivante, (launched 24 May 1796 at Dunkirk).

The original programme had provided for a total of twenty-four vessels of this class, of which twenty were actually ordered between October 1793 and April 1794. Apart from the nine vessels listed above, three further vessels begun in 1795/98 were intended to be of this class – Pallas at Saint-Malo, and Furieuse and Guerrière at Cherbourg; but all were completed as 18-pounder armed frigates (see above). Another two vessels to this design – the Fatalité (ordered in 1793 at Saint-Malo) and Nouvelle (ordered in 1794 at Lorient) - were never completed; the remainder of the original programme appear never to have been begun.

== Frigates under Louis XVIII and later (1815–1860) ==
After 1815, French frigates continued to be graded according to the calibre of their main battery as frégates portant du 18, 24 or (after 1820) 30. However, in 1827 they were classified as either 1st, 2nd or 3rd class. The 1st class carried a main battery of 30-pounder guns, and the 2nd class a main battery of 24-pounder guns. The 3rd class initially comprised the remaining pre-1815 vessels with 18-pounder guns, but after 1830 a new group of 3rd class frigates was built with 30-pounder guns (although fewer in quantity than the 1st Rate frigates carried). In 1837 this classification was amended to base the division on the number of guns carried.

=== Third class frigates (from 1830), 30-pounder armed ===
Initially defined as frigates with a main armament of 18-pounder guns, this category was amended to define them as frigates of either 46 or 40 guns.

- Héliopolis class (46-gun type, 1830 design by Jean-Baptiste Hubert, with 26 × 18-pounder guns, 16 × 30-pounder carronades and 4 × 30-pounder shell guns):
  - Erigone, (launched 27 September 1836 at Saint-Servan) – deleted 31 December 1864.
  - Africaine, (launched 9 August 1839 at Saint-Servan) – deleted 7 March 1867.
  - Chartre, (launched 6 August 1842 at Brest) – renamed Constitution 28 February 1849; deleted 31 December 1879.
  - Héliopolis, (launched 25 August 1847 at Rochefort) – deleted 27 February 1880.
  - Two more frigates at Brest – Bouvines and Psyché – probably to have been to this design, were cancelled in 1831.
  - Five more frigates – Pomone, Nymphe, Thémis, Antigone and Psyché – possibly to the same design, were cancelled in 1836–37.
- Pénélope class (46-gun type, 1830 design by Jean-François Guillemard, with 26 × 18-pounder guns, 16 × 30-pounder carronades and 4 × 30-pounder shell guns):
  - Pénélope, (launched 25 November 1840 at Lorient) – deleted 22 December 1864.
  - Jeanne d'Arc, (launched 8 November 1847 at Lorient) – deleted 22 December 1864.
- Psyché class (40-gun type, 1842 design by Mathurin-François Boucher, with 22 × 30-pounder guns, 14 × 30-pounder carronades and 4 × 30-pounder shell guns):
  - Psyché, (launched 28 September 1844 at Brest) – deleted 15 July 1867.
  - Clorinde, (launched 19 August 1845 at Cherbourg) – fitted as steam frigate 1857; deleted 26 January 1888.
  - Isis, (launched 29 July 1851 at Brest) – deleted 12 November 1886.
  - Armorique, (launched 1 March 1862 at Lorient as a steam frigate) – deleted 8 November 1884.
- Algérie class (40-gun type, 1842 design by Jean-Baptiste Hubert, with 26 × 30-pounder guns, 8 × 30-pounder carronades, and 2 × 80-pounder and 4 × 30-pounder shell guns):
  - Algérie, (launched 4 March 1848 at Rochefort) – deleted 15 July 1867.
- Cérès class (40-gun type, 1846 design by Pierre-Félix Le Grix, with 26 × 30-pounder guns, 8 × 30-pounder carronades, and 2 × 80-pounder and 4 × 30-pounder shell guns):
  - Cérès, (launched 26 March 1857 at Lorient as a steam transport) – deleted 8 November 1884.
- Résolue class (40-gun type, 1846 design by Charles-Henri Moll, with 26 × 30-pounder guns, 8 × 30-pounder carronades, and 2 × 80-pounder and 4 × 30-pounder shell guns):
  - Résolue, (launched 18 June 1863 at Cherbourg as a steam frigate) – deleted 31 December 1890.

=== Second class frigates, 24-pounder armed ===
Initially defined as frigates with a main armament of 24-pounder guns, this category was amended to define them as frigates of 58 guns, later either 52 or 50 guns.

- Jeanne d'Arc class (58-gun type, 1819 design by Charles-Michel Simon, with 30 × 24-pounder and 2 × 18-pounder guns, and 26 × 36-pounder carronades):
  - Jeanne d'Arc, (launched 5 August 1820 at Brest) – deleted 26 October 1833.
  - Amazone, (launched 1 May 1821 at Brest) – deleted 13 March 1841.
- Clorinde class (58-gun type, 1819 design by Louis-Jean-Baptiste Bretocq, with 30 × 24-pounder and 2 × 18-pounder guns, and 26 × 36-pounder carronades):
  - Clorinde, (launched 5 February 1821 at Cherbourg) – deleted 26 October 1833.
- Vestale class (58-gun type, 1820 design by Paul Filhon, comprising 30 × 24-pounder and 2 × 18-pounder guns, and 26 × 36-pounder carronades):
  - Vestale, (launched 6 May 1822 at Rochefort) – deleted 26 May 1831.
  - Vénus, (launched 11 March 1823 at Lorient) – deleted 1847.
  - Atalante, (launched 2 April 1825 at Lorient) – deleted 28 December 1850.
- Marie Thérèse class (58-gun type, 1820 design by Gustave-Benoît Garnier, comprising 30 × 24-pounder and 2 × 18-pounder guns, and 26 × 36-pounder carronades):
  - Marie Therese, (launched 17 May 1823 at Toulon) – renamed Calypso 9 August 1830; deleted 23 April 1856.
  - Syrène, (launched 25 July 1823 at Toulon) – deleted 20 July 1861.
- Artémise class (52-gun type, 1826 design by Jean-Baptiste Hubert):
  - Artémise, (launched 1828 at Lorient) – deleted 3 October 1840.
  - Andromède, (launched 5 April 1833 at Lorient) – deleted 24 October 1860.
  - Néréide, (launched 17 February 1836 at Lorient) – deleted 30 December 1887.
  - Gloire, (launched 1837 at Rochefort) – wrecked 10 August 1847 off Korea.
  - Cléopâtre, (launched 23 April 1838 at Saint-Servan) – deleted 31 December 1864.
  - Danaé, (launched 23 May 1838 at Saint-Servan) – fitted as steam frigate 1857 – deleted 18 January 1878.
  - Virginie, (launched 25 April 1842 at Rochefort) – deleted 13 May 1881.
  - Circé, (launched 15 October 1860 at Rochefort as a steam frigate) – deleted 22 July 1872.
  - Hermione, (launched 16 August 1860 at Brest as a steam frigate) – deleted 11 May 1877.
  - Junon, (launched 28 January 1861 at Brest as a steam frigate) – deleted 24 March 1872.
  - Flore, (launched 27 February 1869 at Rochefort as a steam frigate) – deleted 18 October 1886.
- Poursuivante class (50-gun type, 1827 design by Louis-Charles Barrallier):
  - Poursuivante, (launched 16 November 1844 at Toulon) – deleted 31 December 1864.
  - Zénobie, (launched 29 July 1847 at Toulon) – fitted as steam frigate 1857 – deleted 7 August 1868.
  - Sibylle, (launched 7 November 1847 at Toulon) – deleted 13 May 1881.

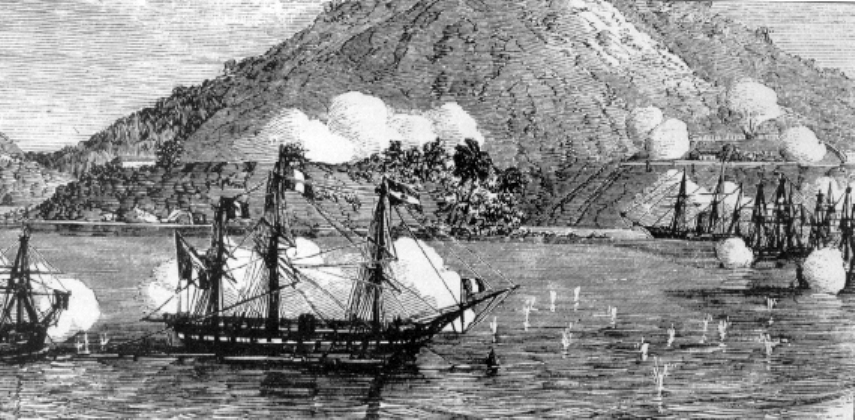
French frigate Némésis, at the Siege of Đà Nẵng, Vietnam in 1858.

- Némésis class (50-gun type, 1828 design by Jean-Baptiste-Charles Perroy):
  - Némésis, (launched 14 April 1847 at Brest) – deleted 19 April 1866.
  - Pandore, (launched 26 March 1846 at Brest) – fitted as steam frigate 1857; deleted 2 November 1877.
  - Another unit of this class – Clorinde at Brest – was cancelled in 1838.
- Alceste class (50-gun type, 1829 design by Paul-Marie Leroux):
  - Alceste, (launched 28 March 1846 at Cherbourg) – deleted 31 May 1886; deleted 31 May 1886.
  - Reine Blanche, (launched 15 September 1837 at Cherbourg) – deleted 23 June 1859.
- Amazone class (50-gun type, 1845 design by Alexandre-Louis Chedeville):
  - Bellone, (launched 26 March 1853 at Cherbourg) – fitted as steam frigate 1856–58; deleted 22 February 1877.
  - Amazone, (launched 30 March 1858 at Brest as a steam transport) – deleted 15 February 1872.
- Astrée class (50-gun type, 1845 design by Pierre-Félix Le Grix):
  - Dryade, (launched 29 December 1856 at Lorient as a steam transport) – deleted 13 February 1883.
  - Astrée, (launched 24 December 1859 at Lorient as a steam frigate) – deleted 3 May 1877.
- Magicienne class (50-gun type, 1845 design by Prix-Charles-Jean-Baptiste Sochet):
  - Magicienne, (launched 26 December 1861 at Toulon as a steam frigate) – deleted 19 April 1886.
  - Thémis, (launched 29 April 1862 at Toulon as a steam frigate) – deleted 7 November 1882.

=== First class frigates, 30-pounder armed ===
Initially defined as frigates with a main armament of 30-pounder guns, this category was amended to define them as frigates of 60 guns.

- Surveillante class, (60-gun first rate type, 1823 design by Mathurin-François Boucher, with 30 × 30-pounder guns, 28 × 30-pounder carronades and 2 × 18-pounder guns – later units had altered 60-gun armament):
  - Surveillante, (launched 29 September 1825 at Lorient) – deleted 22 August 1844.
  - Belle Gabrielle, (launched 28 June 1828 at Cherbourg) – renamed Indépendante 9 August 1830, deleted 24 October 1860.
  - Melpomène, (launched 28 July 1828 at Cherbourg) – deleted 20 March 1845.
  - Herminie, (launched 25 August 1828 at Lorient) – wrecked off Bermuda 3 December 1838.
  - Belle Poule, (launched 26 March 1834 at Cherbourg) – deleted 19 March 1861.
  - Sémillante, (launched 6 February 1841 at Lorient) – wrecked 16 February 1855 off Bonifacio.
  - Andromaque, (launched 8 March 1841 at Lorient) – deleted 17 August 1869.
  - Forte, (launched 16 September 1841 at Cherbourg) – deleted 23 October 1883.
  - Pallas, (launched 15 August 1860 at Lorient as a steam frigate) – deleted 23 October 1883.
- Iphigénie class (60-gun first rate type, 1823 design by Jean-François-Henry De la Morinière, with 30 × 30-pounder guns, 28 × 30-pounder carronades and 2 × 18-pounder guns):
  - Iphigénie, (launched 3 May 1827 at Toulon) – deleted 1 July 1872.
- Terpsichore class (60-gun first rate type, 1823 design by Philippe-Jacques Moreau, with 30 × 30-pounder guns, 28 × 30-pounder carronades and 2 × 18-pounder guns):
  - Terpsichore, (launched 12 May 1827 at Brest) – deleted 6 February 1839.
- Dryade class, (60-gun first rate type, 1823 design by Paul-Marie Leroux, with 30 × 30-pounder guns, 28 × 30-pounder carronades and 2 × 18-pounder guns):
  - Dryade, (launched 12 July 1828 at Rochefort) – renamed Caroline on launching but reverted to Dryade 9 August 1830 – deleted 9 May 1838.
  - Didon, (launched 15 July 1828 at Toulon) – deleted 28 March 1867.
  - Renommée, (launched 28 July 1847 at Rochefort) – fitted as steam-assisted frigate 1858 – deleted 15 November 1878.
  - Guerrière, (launched 3 May 1860 at Brest as a steam frigate) – deleted 28 May 1888.
  - Sémiramis, (launched 8 August 1861 at Rochefort as a steam frigate) – deleted 3 May 1877.
- Uranie class (60-gun first rate type, 1826 design by Louis-Charles Barrallier, with 30 × 30-pounder guns, 28 × 30-pounder carronades and 2 × 18-pounder guns):
  - Uranie, (launched 28 July 1832 at Toulon) – deleted 31 December 1864.
- Persévérante class (60-gun first rate type, 1829 design by Charles-Michel Simon, with 30 × 30-pounder guns, 28 × 30-pounder carronades and 2 × 18-pounder guns):
  - Persévérante, (launched 28 June 1847 at Brest) – deleted 28 March 1867.
  - Two probable sisters at Brest – Jeanne d’Albret and Valentine – were cancelled in 1831.
- Vengeance class (60-gun first rate type, 1829 design by Mathurin-François Boucher, with 30 × 30-pounder guns, 28 × 30-pounder carronades and 2 × 18-pounder guns):
  - Vengeance, (launched 1 July 1848 at Lorient) – deleted 19 April 1866.
  - Entreprenante, (launched 4 November 1858 at Lorient as a steam transport)- deleted 6 July 1885.
  - Victoire, (launched 21 August 1861 at Lorient as a steam frigate) – deleted 13 February 1880.

Note that four 74-gun ships of the line were cut down (razéed), all at Brest Dockyard) during the 1820s, to become 1st class frigates of 58 guns, retaining their two complete gundecks, but with the gaillards (quarter decks and forecastles) removed. They carried 28 × 36-pounder guns, 28 × 36-pounder carronades, and 2 × 18-pounder guns:

- Romulus, in 1821 (renamed Guerrière).
- Agamemnon in 1823 (renamed Amphitrite).
- Colosse, in 1827 (renamed Pallas).
- Glorieux in 1831 (renamed Minerve).

== See also ==
- Hermione, a reproduction of the 1779 Hermione, completed in Rochefort in 2014.
- List of French steam frigates
- List of French modern frigates
- List of French current frigates
- List of ships of the line of France
