= List of steam frigates of France =

This is a comprehensive list of 19th-century French steam-driven (or steam-assisted) frigates and corvettes - both paddle-driven and screw-propelled varieties - of the period 1838 to 1860 (including wooden-hulled frigates commenced before but launched after 1860), after which the wooden-hulled frigate merged into the evolving cruiser category.

== Paddle corvettes ==
- Véloce class, 7 guns
  - Véloce, launched 12 March 1838 at Rochefort
  - Lavoisier, launched 4 October 1838 at Indret
  - Caméléon, launched 20 November 1839 at Rochefort
  - Gassendi, launched 27 September 1840 at Indret
  - Pluton, launched 22 April 1841 at Brest
- Cuvier, 12, launched 5 September 1842 at Lorient
- Archimède, 6, launched 25 April 1842 at Brest
- Converted paddle packets
  - Phoque (begun as Transatlantic Packetboat No.15), 6, launched 7 August 1842 at Indret
  - Espadon (begun as Transatlantic Packetboat No.16), 6, launched 4 October 1842 at Indret
  - Elan (begun as Transatlantic Packetboat No.17), 6, launched 30 March 1843 at Indret
  - Caïman (begun as Transatlantic Packetboat No.18), 6, launched 28 June 1843 at Indret
- Titan, 4, launched 19 March 1844 at Toulon
- Cassini, 4, launched 22 April 1845 at Lorient
- Prony (ex-Socrate), 5, launched 23 September 1847 at Brest/Indret
- Colbert, 8, launched 5 May 1848 at Cherbourg
- Newton, 6, launched 14 October 1848 at Cherbourg
- Catinat, 6, launched 11 October 1851 at Rochefort
- Coligny, 4, launched 5 November 1850 at Rochefort
- Eumenide, 4, launched 23 March 1848 at Chaigneau & Bichon, Bordeaux
- Gorgone, 4, launched 14 August 1848 at Chaigneau & Bichon, Bordeaux
- Laborieux, 2, launched 29 July 1848 at Rochefort
- Souffleur, 2, launched 17 September 1849 at Indret
- Tanger class, 4 guns
  - Tanger, launched 26 March 1849 at Brest
  - Tisiphone, launched 27 August 1851 at Lorient
- Berthollet, 6, launched 7 July 1850 at Rochefort

== Paddle frigates ==
- Gomer class, 20 guns
  - Gomer, launched 19 July 1841 at Rochefort
  - Asmodée, launched 20 October 1841 at Rochefort
- Converted paddle packets
  - Darien (begun as Transatlantic Packetboat No.1), 14, launched 6 October 1842 at Cherbourg
  - Ulloa (begun as Transatlantic Packetboat No.2), 14, launched 8 August 1842 at Cherbourg
  - Canada (begun as Transatlantic Packetboat No.3), 14, launched 15 March 1843 at Brest
  - Christophe Colomb (begun as Transatlantic Packetboat No.4), 16, launched 15 March 1843 at Brest
  - Magellan (begun as Transatlantic Packetboat No.5), 14, launched 15 May 1843 at Brest
  - Caraïbe (begun as Transatlantic Packetboat No.6), 14, launched 2 December 1842 at Lorient - wrecked 11 January 1847
  - Cacique (begun as Transatlantic Packetboat No.7), 14, launched 9 September 1843 at Lorient
  - Eldorado (begun as Transatlantic Packetboat No.8), 14, launched 7 December 1843 at Lorient
  - Groenland (begun as Transatlantic Packetboat No.9), 14, launched 13 May 1843 at Rochefort - wrecked 26 August 1844
  - Montézuma (begun as Transatlantic Packetboat No.10), 14, launched 28 June 1843 at Rochefort – wrecked 27 July 1863, burnt 10 September 1863
  - Panama (begun as Transatlantic Packetboat No.11), 14, launched 21 November 1843 at Rochefort
  - Albatross (begun as Transatlantic Packetboat No.12), 14, launched 15 July 1844 at Rochefort
  - Labrador (begun as Transatlantic Packetboat No.13), 14, launched 7 August 1842 at Toulon
  - Orénoque (begun as Transatlantic Packetboat No.14), 14, launched 19 August 1843 at Toulon
- Infernal, 8, launched 1 May 1843 at Rochefort
- Descartes, 20, launched 5 March 1844 at Rochefort
- Vauban, 20, launched 10 March 1845 at Lorient
- Caffarelli, 20, launched 29 May 1847 at Brest
- Sané, 20, launched 15 February 1847 at Cherbourg - wrecked 23 September 1859
- Mogador, 8, launched 19 February 1848 at Rochefort

== Screw frigates ==
- Némésis
- Isly, 40 guns, launched 19 July 1849 at Brest
- Impératrice Eugénie class, 56 guns
  - Impératrice Eugénie, launched 21 August 1856 at Toulon
  - Foudre, launched 2 December 1856 at Toulon
  - Audacieuse, launched 22 January 1856 at Brest
  - Ardente, launched 25 May 1857 at Brest
- Impetueuse class, 56 guns
  - Impétueuse, launched 15 August 1856 at Cherbourg
  - Souveraine, launched 3 June 1856 at Lorient
- Bellone, 36, converted from sail 1857-59 at Cherbourg
- Clorinde, 36, converted from sail 1857
- Danaé, 36, converted from sail 1857
- Pandore, 36, converted from sail 1857
- Pomone, 36, converted from sail 1845
- Renommée, 40, converted from sail 1857
- Zénobie, 36, converted from sail 1857
- Sail frigates converted to steam on the stocks while building:
  - Astrée, 28, launched 24 December 1859 at Lorient
  - Guerrière, 34, launched 3 May 1860 at Brest
  - Pallas, 34, launched 15 August 1860 at Lorient
  - Hermione, 28, launched 15 August 1860 at Brest
  - Circé, 28, launched 15 October 1860 at Rochefort
  - Junon, 28, launched 28 January 1861 at Brest
  - Sémiramis, 34, launched 8 August 1861 at Rochefort
  - Victoire, 34, launched 21 August 1861 at Lorient
  - Magicienne, 28, launched 26 December 1861 at Toulon
  - Armorique, 22, launched 1 March 1862 at Lorient
  - Thémis, 28, launched 29 April 1862 at Toulon
  - Résolue, 22, launched 18 June 1863 at Cherbourg
  - Flore, 25, launched 27 February 1869 at Rochefort

== See also ==
- List of French sail frigates
- List of French modern frigates
- List of French current frigates

== Sources and Bibliography ==
- Demerliac, Alain: La Marine de la Restauration et de Louis-Philippe 1er: Nomenclature des Navires Français de 1815 a 1848. Éditions A.N.C.R.E., Nice, 2007.
- Roche, Jean-Michel: Dictionnaire des Bâtiments de la Flotte de Guerre Française de Colbert a nos jours - Tome (Volume) I, 1781-1870. Self-publication, 2005.
- Winfield, Rif and Roberts, Stephen (2015) French Warships in the Age of Sail 1786-1861: Design, Construction, Careers and Fates. Seaforth Publishing. ISBN 978-1-84832-204-2.
