= Comète =

Comète is French for "comet." It also may refer to:

- The Comet Line, also known as the Comète Line, a Resistance organization in occupied Belgium and France during World War II
- Ford Comète, later known as the Simca Comète, a car built in France between 1951 and 1954
- French ship Comète, more than one ship of the French Navy
