= List of French current frigates =

This is a list of frigates in service with the French Navy as of 2024:

== First rank frigates ==
The French Navy does not use the term "destroyer" but rather classifies these vessels as "first-rate frigates". Nevertheless, they are identified with the NATO "D" designation which ranks them in the destroyer class, instead of ranking them with an "F" designation as frigates. As of 2023, all French warships are having their hull numbers removed in order to reduce the ability to identify individual ships.

- Horizon class - 2 ships (primary air defence role)
  - D620 Forbin
  - D621 Chevalier Paul
- Aquitaine class - 8 ships (6 primary anti-submarine warfare (ASW) /land attack role; 2 primary air defence/ASW role)
  - D650 Aquitaine
  - D652 Provence
  - D653 Languedoc
  - D654 Auvergne
  - D655 Bretagne
  - D651 Normandie
  - D656 Alsace (primary air defence/ASW role)
  - D657 Lorraine (primary air defence/ASW role)
- Amiral Ronarc'h class - 1 ship (four more ordered; dual ASW/air defence role)
  - D660 Amiral Ronarc'h (on sea trials as of late 2024)

== Second rank frigates ==
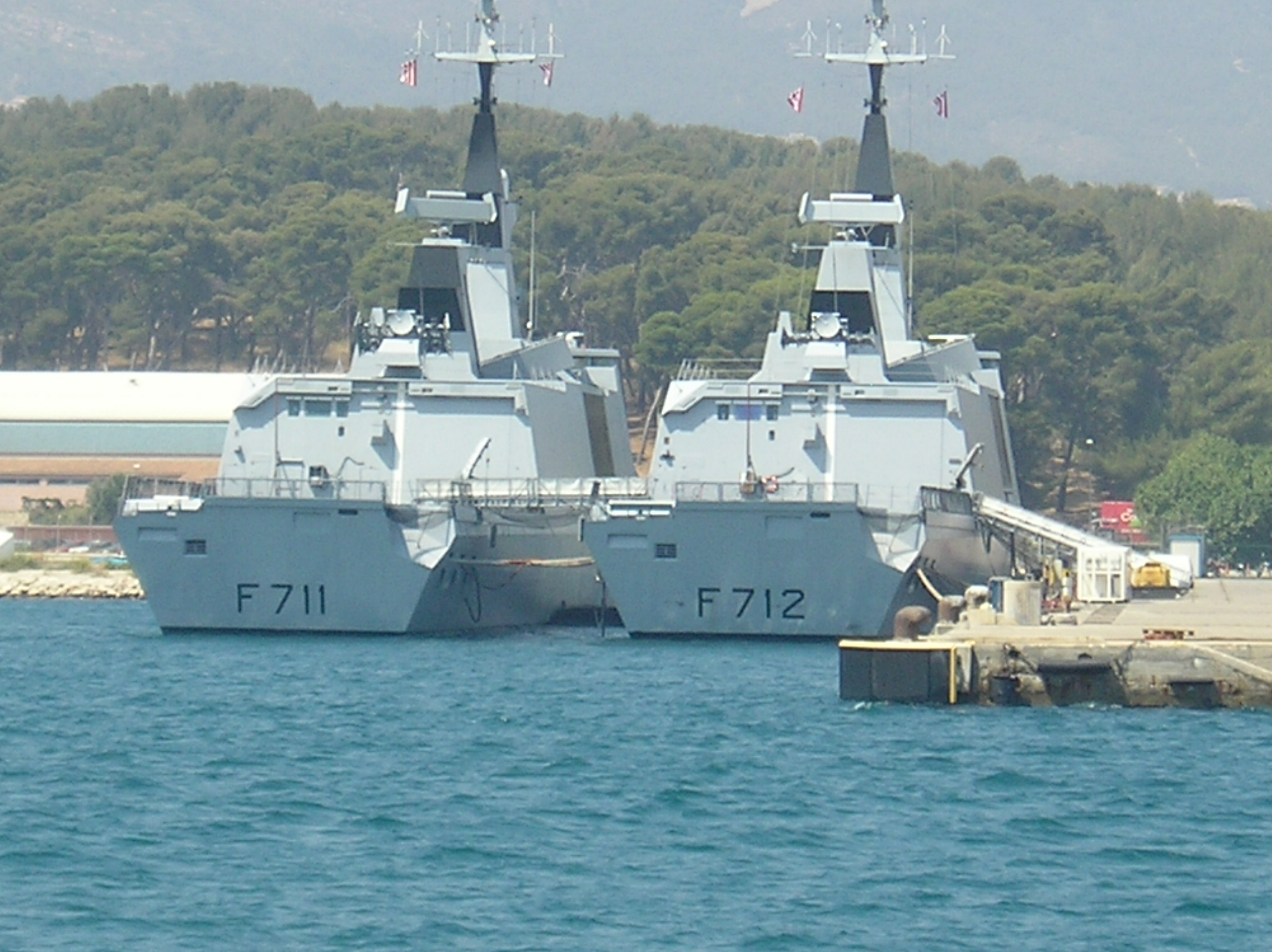
Stealth frigates Surcouf and Courbet

Three La Fayette class (La Fayette, Courbet and Aconit) warships have been upgraded, with the incorporation of a hull-mounted sonar and the modernization of various other systems.

- La Fayette class - 5 ships (general purpose/escort role)
  - F710 La Fayette
  - F711 Surcouf
  - F712 Courbet
  - F713 Aconit
  - F714 Guépratte
- Floréal class - 6 ships (sovereignty protection/patrol role for French overseas territories)
  - F730 Floréal
  - F731 Prairial
  - F732 Nivôse
  - F733 Ventôse
  - F734 Vendémiaire
  - F735 Germinal

== See also ==
- French Navy
- List of French sail frigates
- List of French steam frigates
- List of French modern frigates
