= French ship Comète =

At least three ships of the French Navy have borne the name Comète:

- French frigate Comète (1752), a frigate launched in 1752
- French frigate Comète (1796), a frigate launched in 1796 and scrapped in 1810
- French gunboat Comète, a gunboat that saw action in the 1893 Franco-Siamese crisis
