= List of French modern frigates =

The list of French modern frigates covers ships acquired or built between 1925 and the present day. This list is not comprehensive. In France, "destroyers" are called "contre-torpilleurs" or "first rank frigates"; hence, destroyer-size ships might be listed here. During the 1940s, frigate-size ships were called "torpilleurs".

- Bourrasque class
  - Orage (1926)
  - Ouragan (1927)
  - Simoun (1926)
  - Tramontane (1927)
  - Trombe (1927)
  - Bourrasque (1926)
  - Cyclone (1927)
  - Mistral (1927)
  - Siroco (1927)
  - Tempête (1926)
  - Typhon (1928)
  - Tornade (1928)
- Adroit class
  - Mars (1926)
  - Le Fortuné (1926)
  - Palme (1926)
  - La Railleuse (1926)
  - Alcyon (1926)
  - L'Adroit (1927)
  - Boulonnais (1928)
  - Brestois (1928)
  - Bordelais (1930)
  - Basque (1930)
  - Forbin (1930)
  - Fougueux (1930)
  - Foudroyant (1931)
  - Frondeur (1931)
- Aigle class
  - Albatros (F762, 1931)
- Hardi class
  - Hardi (1938)
  - Fleuret (1938)
  - L'Adroit (ex-Épée) (1938)
  - Mameluck (1939)
  - Casque (1938)
  - Lansquenet (1939)
  - Siroco (ex-Corsaire) (1939)
  - Bison (ex-Flibustier) (1939)
- La Melpomène class
  - La Melpomène (1936)
  - La Flore (1936)
  - La Pomone (1936)
  - L'Iphigénie (1936)
  - La Bayonnaise (1938)
  - La Cordelière (1938)
  - L'Incomprise (1938)
  - La Pousuivante (1937)
  - Bombarde (1937)
  - Branlebas (1938)
  - Bouclier (1938)
  - Baliste (1938)
- Bougainville class
  - La Grandière (ex-Ville d'Ys) (F731, 1940)
  - Dumont d'Urville (F732, 1932)
  - Savorgnan de Brazza (F733, 1933)
- Chamois class
  - Annamite (F734, 1940)
  - Chevreuil (F735, 1939)
  - Gazelle (F736, 1939)
  - Bisson (F737, 1947)
  - Cdt Amyot d'Inville (F738, 1947)
  - Cdt de Pimodan (F739, 1947)
- Elan class
  - Cdt Bory (F740, 1939)
  - Cdt Delage (F741, 1939)
  - Cdt Domine (F742, 1940)
  - Cdt Duboc (F743, 1939)
  - La Boudeuse (F744, 1940)
  - La Capricieuse (F745, 1940)
  - La Gracieuse (F746, 1940)
  - La Moqueuse (F747, 1940)
  - Elan (F748, 1939)
- La Combattante (1943)
- Alsacien (1942)
- Lorrain (1943)
- Cannon class
  - Algérien (F701, 1943)
  - Sénégalais (F702, 1943)
  - Somali (F703, 1944)
  - Hova (F704, 1944)
  - Marocain (F705, 1944)
  - Tunisien (F706, 1943)
- River class
  - Croix de Lorraine (F710, 1943)
  - L'Aventure (F707, 1944)
  - L'Escarmouche (F709, 1944)
  - La Découverte (F712, 1943)
  - La Surprise (F708, 1944)
  - Tonkinois (F711, 1943)
- Tacoma class
  - Mermoz (F714) (1947)
  - La Place (F713) (1947)
  - Le Brix (F715) (1947)
  - Le Verrier (F716) (1947)
- Francis Garnier (F730, 1948)
- Cannon class
  - Arabe (F717) (1950)
  - Kabyle (F718) (1950)
  - Bambara (F719) (1950)
  - Sakalave (F720) (1950)
  - Touareg (F721) (1950)
  - Soudanais (F722) (1950)
  - Berbère (F723) (1952)
  - Malgache (F724) (1952)
- Le Corse class
  - Le Corse (F761, 1955)
  - Le Brestois (F762, 1956)
  - Le Boulonnais (F763, 1956)
  - Le Bordelais (F764, 1955)
- Le Normand class
  - Le Normand (F765, 1956)
  - Le Picard (F766, 1956)
  - Le Gascon (F767, 1957)
  - Le Lorrain (F768, 1957)
  - Le Bourguignon (F769, 1957)
  - Le Champenois (F770, 1957)
  - Le Savoyard (F771, 1957)
  - Le Breton (F772, 1957)
  - Le Basque (F773, 1957)
  - L'Agenais (F774, 1958)
  - Le Béarnais (F775, 1958)
  - L'Alsacien (F776, 1960)
  - Le Provencal (F777, 1959)
  - Le Vendéen (F778, 1960)
- Commandant Rivière class
  - Victor Schoelcher (F725, 1962)
  - Commandant Bory (F726, 1964)
  - Doudart de Lagrée (F728, 1963)
  - Balny (F729, 1966)
  - Commandant Rivière (F733, 1962)
  - Commandant Bourdais (F740, 1963)
  - Protet (F748, 1964)
  - Enseigne de vaisseau Henry (F749, 1965)
- L'Ardent (P635, 1958)
- L'Intrepide (P636, 1958)
- L'Étourdi (P637, 1958)
- L'Effronté (P638, 1959)
- Le Frondeur (P639, 1959)
- Le Fringant (P640, 1959)
- L'opiniâtre (P644, 1954)
- Le Fougueux (P641, 1954)
- L'Agile (P642, 1954)
- L'Adroit (P643, 1957)
- L'Alerte (P645, 1957)
- L'Attentif (P646, 1957)
- L'Enjoue (P647, 1957)
- Le Hardi (P648, 1958)
- Amiral Mouchez (F752, 1937)
- Paul Goffeny (F754, 1948)
- Cdt Robert Giraud (F755, 1947)
- D'Estienne d'Orves class
  - D'Estienne d'Orves (F781, 1976)
  - Amyot d'Inville (F782, 1976)
  - Drogou (F783, 1976)
  - Detroyat (F784, 1977)
  - Jean Moulin (F785, 1977)
  - Quartier-Maître Anquetil (F786, 1977)
  - Commandant de Pimodan (F787, 1978)
  - Second-Maitre Le Bihan (F788, 1978)
  - Lieutenant de vaisseau Le Henaff (F789, 1979)
  - Lieutenant de vaisseau Lavallée (F790, 1980)
  - Premier-maître l'Her (F792, 1981)

== See also ==
- List of French sail frigates
- List of French steam frigates
- List of French current frigates

== Sources and references ==
- Chesneau, Roger, ed. (1980). Conway's All the World's Fighting Ships 1922–1946. Greenwich, UK: Conway Maritime Press. ISBN 0-85177-146-7.
- Whitley, MH : Destroyers of World War Two (1988) ISBN 1-85409-521-8
- (in French) Bâtiments désarmés on NetMarine.net
