= HMS Emerald (1757) =

Frigate of the Royal Navy

History

France
- Name: Emeraude
- Laid down: February 1744 at Le Havre
- Launched: 10 June 1744
- In service: 1744–1757
- Captured: 1757
- Fate: Captured by Royal Navy, 21 September 1757

History

Great Britain
- Name: HMS Emerald
- Completed: 8 July 1758 at Portsmouth Dockyard
- Acquired: 21 September 1757
- Commissioned: April 1758
- In service: 1758–1761
- Fate: Broken up, Portsmouth Dockyard, November 1761

General characteristics
- Class & type: 28-gun frigate
- Displacement: 900 tonneaux
- Tons burthen: 480 port tonneaux; 571 26/94 bm
- Length: 115 ft 4 in (35.2 m) (gundeck); 93 ft 2 in (28.4 m) (keel)
- Beam: 33 ft 11.5 in (10.4 m)
- Depth of hold: 9 ft 4 in (2.8 m)
- Complement: 180
- Armament: 24 × 9-pdrs (gundeck); 4 x 4-pdrs (forecastle and quarterdeck)

HMS Emerald was a 28-gun frigate of the Royal Navy which saw active service during the Seven Years' War.

Launched in 1744 as the French naval vessel Emeraude, she was captured by HMS Southampton on 21 September 1757 and brought into Portsmouth Dockyard where she was refitted from British service. She was renamed Emerald in December 1757 and commissioned into the Royal Navy in April 1758 under the command of Captain Thomas Cornwall.

Emerald was assigned to patrol and convoy duties in the British Leeward Islands from January 1759, securing three victories over French privateers in the following two years. In July 1760 command was transferred to Captain Charles Middleton, who remained with Emerald for the rest o her Caribbean service. The frigate returned to England in September 1761 and was decommissioned at Portsmouth Dockyard in October. She was declared surplus to Navy requirements on 7 October and broken up at Portsmouth Dockyard in November 1761.
