= French frigate Némésis =

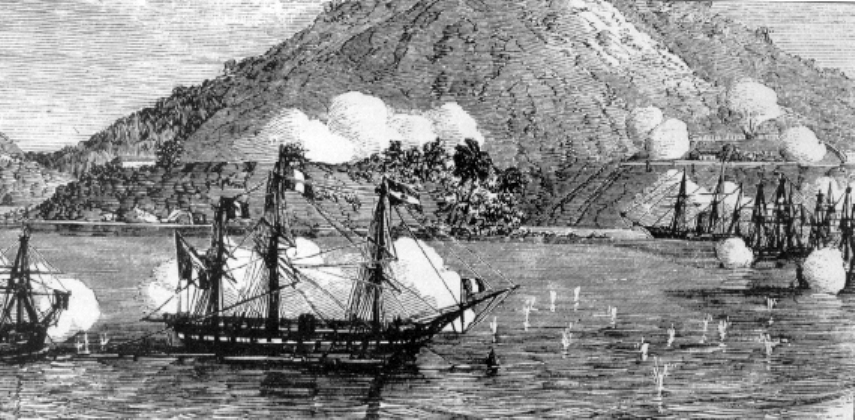
- French frigate Némésis at the Siege of Đà Nẵng, Vietnam in 1858.

History

France
- Name: Némésis
- Operator: French Navy
- Builder: Brest Arsenal
- Launched: 14 April 1847
- Fate: Scrapped 1889

General characteristics
- Class & type: Artémise-class frigate
- Tons burthen: 2344 bm
- Length: 52.5 m (172 ft) (lower deck)
- Beam: 13.4 m (44 ft)
- Draught: 6.1 m (20 ft)
- Depth of hold: 7.05 m (23.1 ft)
- Propulsion: Sail
- Sail plan: Three-masted ship
- Complement: 441
- Armament: Nominally 50 guns.

The French frigate Némésis was an Artémise class screw-powered 50-gun second rate frigate of the French Navy in the 19th century. She was launched in 1847 at Brest, and participated in campaigns in Asia.

In 1857–1858, she was the flagship of Admiral Charles Rigault de Genouilly during the Second Opium War, and in Vietnam at the Siege of Đà Nẵng. In 1857, she ran aground in the Bangka Strait.

She was used for harbour service at Lorient in 1866, and was scrapped in 1889.

== See also ==
- List of French sail frigates
