= Saboulin Bollena =

Coats of arms of the House of Saboulin Bollena: gules three roses argent.

The Saboulin Bollena family (or Sebolin, or Sabolin) is one of the oldest French aristocratic families, from the old feudal nobility of Provence.

== History ==
They lived until 1620 in Var in the cities of Brignoles and Signes where several generations served as Captain General. Furthermore, Francois de Saboulin Bollena, lord of La Motte-du-Caire, first Consul of the city of Hyères, was a deputy sent from the States of Provence to the Estates-General of the kingdom held at Paris in 1614.

The oldest branch of the family next settled in Marseille. In 1668 they were maintained in there nobility by the commissioner appointed by the King in Provence. Pierre de Saboulin Bollena was ealdorman and distinguished himself by the help he gave to the charities for the Holy Land and for the restoration of the Holy Sepulchre Church in Jerusalem, and Francois de Saboulin Bollena, first ealdorman and Mayor, secretary to the King, House and Crown of France.

They intermarried with the families of Beausset, d'Ortigues, Glandevès, d'Amalric, Pontevès-Maubousquet, Valavoire, Clapiers-Collongues, Robineau de Beaulieu, d'Adaoust, Tressemanes-Simiane, Félix de La Ferratière, Guerrier de Dumast.

They participated in the growth of the shipping industry in Marseille through trade with the ports of the Levant - Chios, Constantinople, Sidon - but also with Tetouan, Morocco. They were the first shipowners to organize maritime trade between Marseilles and the West Indies. The present-day Museum of the Old Marseille one of the oldest houses in the city called the "Maison Diamantée" was the mansion-house of the Saboulin Bollena. Armand de Saboulin Bollena served in the French Navy and was injured during the American Revolutionary War.

A branch of the Saboulin family remained in Bayonne, during the 17th and 18th centuries, from which came several generations of corsairs, one of them Michel de Saboulin migrated to Martinique at the end of the 18th century. Jean de Saboulin was a deputy representing the nobility at the General Assembly of the State of the Basque Country in 1789.

Since the second part of the 18th century the family was settled in Nice and Aix-en-Provence, where the oldest branch lived in the castle of Lanfant near Luynes. Other branches lived in Barjac, Lozère at the castle of La Vigne, and in Vannes, Brittany.
