= French frigate Clorinde (1845) =

French Navy frigate

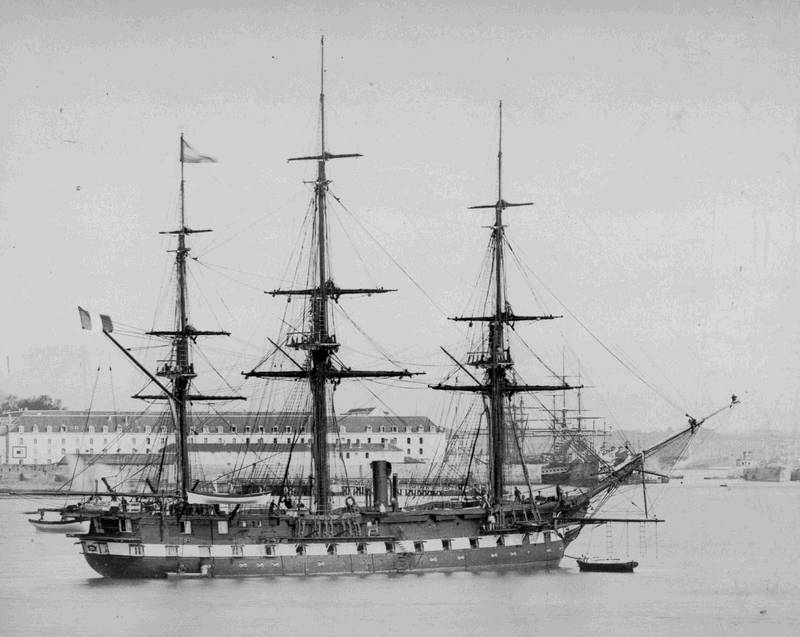
- Clorinde after her transformation into a sail and steam frigate

History

France
- Name: Clorinde
- Namesake: Clorinda
- Ordered: 1841
- Builder: Cherbourg
- Laid down: 5 June 1843
- Launched: 19 August 1845
- Fate: Barracks ship until 1911

General characteristics
- Displacement: 1800 tons
- Propulsion: Sail; Later steam engine with retractable propeller
- Complement: 388 men
- Armament: 46 guns

The Clorinde was a frigate of the French Navy.

== Career ==
Built between 1843 and 1845, Clorinde was launched as a traditional frigate, bearing between 40 and 46 guns. In 1856, she was transformed in Cherbourg with the addition of an 804-shp steam engine and a retractable propeller, to be launched as a steam frigate on 23 May 1857. In 1868, she was sent to Cadiz to watch over French interests in the turmoil of the Glorious Revolution.

Decommissioned in 1875, she was reactivated in 1886 and appointed to the Terre-Neuve division. The next year, she cruised off Island with Châteaurenault.

Very much outdated, Clorinde was struck from the Navy lists in 1888, hulked, and used as barracks in Lorient until 1911.
