= French frigate Comète (1752) =

History

France
- Name: Comète
- Namesake: Comet
- Builder: Joseph-Louis Ollivier, Brest, France
- Laid down: January 1752
- Launched: 20 December 1752
- Commissioned: August 1753
- Fate: Condemned 20 September 1767

General characteristics
- Type: Frigate
- Displacement: 900 tonneaux
- Tons burthen: 520 port tonneaux
- Length: 38.97 m (127 ft 10 in)
- Beam: 10.28 m (33 ft 9 in)
- Draught: 5.21 m (17 ft 1 in)
- Propulsion: Sail
- Complement: 200 officers and men
- Armament: 30 guns: 26 × 8-pounders; 4 × 4-pounders

Comète was a 30-gun French Navy frigate built during the wave of French naval construction that separated the end of the War of the Austrian Succession in 1748 from the start of the Seven Years' War in 1755.

== Construction ==
Comète was laid down by Joseph-Louis Ollivier at Brest, France, in January 1752 and launched on 20 December 1752. She was commissioned in August 1753.

== Service history ==
In 1755, Comète was under the command of Captain de Ruis when she was assigned to Dubois de La Motte's squadron, responsible for transporting important reinforcements to Canada. Comète accomplished her mission without incident, as the reinforcements arrived without being intercepted by the British Royal Navy forces of Admiral of the Blue Edward Boscawen, who sought to prevent the French from arriving in Canada as war resumed between France and the United Kingdom.

In 1757, Comète became part of the division of Joseph-François de Noble du Revest, which left Toulon, France, to defend Louisbourg in Nova Scotia. Arriving safely, she was part of the important naval concentration under the orders of Dubois de La Motte which forced the British to abort a landing attempt. On her return, she was, like the other ships of the squadron, struck by a typhus epidemic which seriously affected their crews and spread to the population of Brest after the ships arrived there.

In the spring of 1758, Comète was part of Louis-Joseph Beaussier de l' Isle's fleet, which was sent to Louisbourg for the defense of the city. By order of Louis Charles du Chaffault de Besné, she sailed for Quebec. On 8 June 1758, she left Canada for France to bring the news of the British landing at La Cormorandière near Louisbourg.

The ship was condemned and struck on 20 September 1767.
