= HMS Nonsuch (1774) =

British ship of the line (1774–1802)

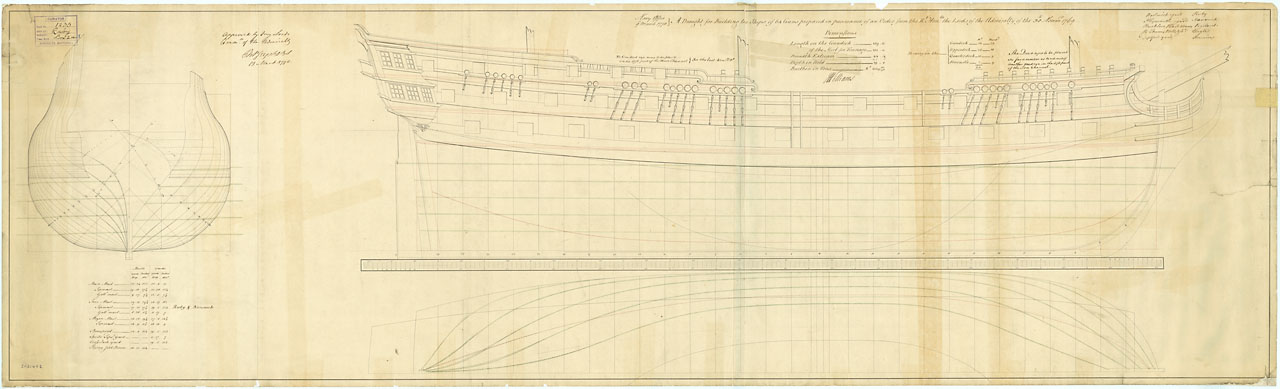
- Nonsuch

History

Great Britain
- Name: HMS Nonsuch
- Ordered: 30 November 1769
- Builder: Israel Pownoll, Plymouth Dockyard
- Laid down: January 1772
- Launched: 17 December 1774
- Fate: Broken up, 1802

General characteristics
- Class & type: Intrepid-class ship of the line
- Tons burthen: 1373 (bm)
- Length: 159 ft 5 in (48.6 m) (gundeck);130 ft 10 1/2 in (39.9 m) (keel)
- Beam: 44 ft 0 7/8 in (13.4 m)
- Depth of hold: 19 ft 0 1/2 in (5.8 m)
- Propulsion: Sails
- Sail plan: Full-rigged ship
- Complement: As third rate: 500 (491 from 1794); As floating battery: 230 officers and men, 14 Marines, and 50 supernumeraries.
- Armament: As third rate: Gun deck: 26 × 24-pounder guns; Upper gun deck: 26 × 18-pounder guns; QD: 10 × 4-pounder guns; Fc: 2 × 9-pounder guns; As floating battery: Lower deck: 20 × 68-pounder carronades; Upper deck: 26 × 24-pounder guns

HMS Nonsuch was a 64-gun third rate ship of the line of the Royal Navy, built by Israel Pownoll and launched on 17 December 1774 at Plymouth. She was broken up in 1802.

== Career ==
Nonsuch was commissioned in August 1775 as a guardship at Plymouth. She was fitted for the role in December 1776, but sailed for North America on 23 March 1777.

American War of Independence

On 16 January 1777, Nonsuch captured the Rhode Island privateer sloop Charming Sally.

On 25 May 1778, Nonsuch's boats captured the Spitfire galley of the Rhode Island Navy at Fall River, Massachusetts, during the Mount Hope Bay raids.

Nonsuch participated in the battle of St. Lucia on 15 December 1778.

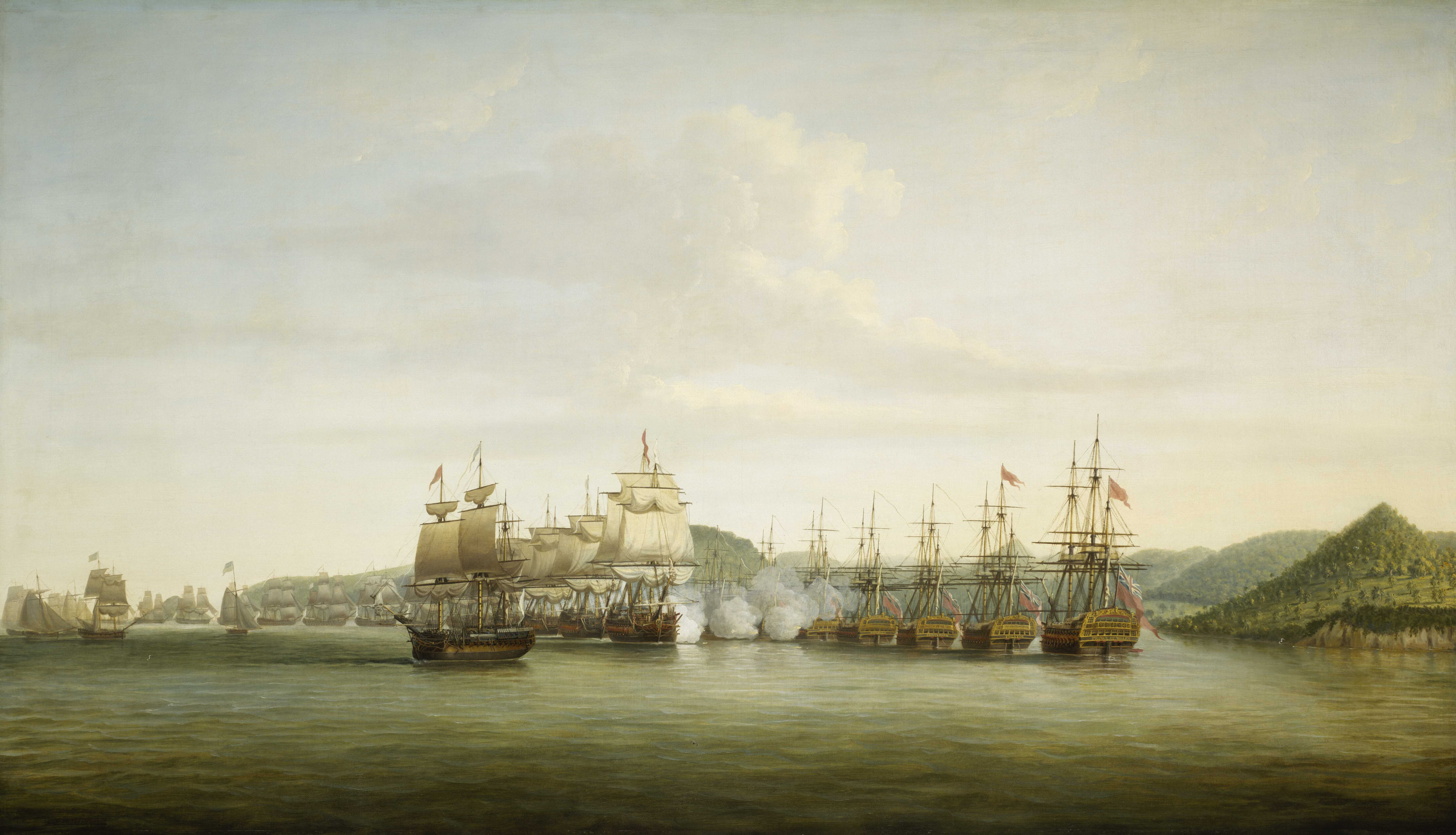
Nonsuch appears in this depiction by Dominic Serres of Barrington's 1778 action at St Lucia.

On 7 July 1780 Nonsuch, under the command of Sir James Wallace, captured the brig-rigged cutter Hussard of Saint Malo. Hussard was armed with eighteen 6-pounder guns. The Royal Navy took her into service as HMS Echo.

On 14 July, Nonsuch captured the 26-gun frigate Belle Poule off the Loire. The Royal Navy took Belle Poule into service under her existing name.

In April 1781, Nonsuch was part of Admiral George Darby's relief fleet during the Great Siege of Gibraltar. On 14 May 1781, on the homeward voyage, while scouting ahead, Nonsuch chased and brought to action the French 74-gun Actif, hoping to detain her until some others of the fleet came up. However, Actif was able to repulse Nonsuch, causing her to suffer 26 men killed and 64 wounded, and continued on to Brest.

Nonsuch was fourth in line attacking the French fleet at the Battle of the Saintes on 12 April 1782) under command of Captain Truscott.

Late in 1782 Nonsuch and Zebra escorted a fleet from Georgia "with the principal inhabitants, their Negroes, and their Effects" to Jamaica.

Floating battery
Between February and May 1794 Nonsuch was at Chatham, being cut down and fitted as a floating battery. Captain Bill Douglas commissioned her in March. In June she was at Jersey under Captain Philippe d'Auvergne, Prince of Bouillon, and Senior Officer of Gunboats, in charge of a small flotilla of useless gunvessels, including Eagle, Lion, Repulse, Scorpion, and Tiger. (The Navy disposed of most of them within a year or so.) Nonsuch was paid off in December. In February 1795 Captain William Mitchell recommissioned her in the Humber at Hull as a floating battery.

Mitchell's successor, in August, was Captain Henry Blackwood. Nonsuch's logs state she arrived in the Humber at the end of June 1795, having sailed up from Chatham under Blackwood's command. By 2 July she was in a permanent mooring at Hull Roads.

In April 1796 Captain Robert Dudley Oliver replaced Blackwood, only to be replaced in October 1797 by Captain Isaac Woolley, who commanded her until 1799.

On 30 July 1797, the whaler Blenheim, William Mitchenson, master, arrived back at Hull from Davis Strait. As she arrived Nonsuch fired a shot to signal Blenheim to come to. Mitchenson ignored that signal, and several other shots. When Blenheim arrived at the port's haven, boats from Nonsuch, Redoubt, and Nautilus surrounded her. As the boats approached with the intent to board, Blenheim's crew pelted them with spears, capstan bars, handspikes, other offensive weapons, and also several large iron shot. The boats withdrew, but not before three men from Nonsuch were wounded, two mortally. Blenheim's crew got to shore and absconded. The government promised to pardon all of the members of the crew other than those that had actually murdered the two men from Nonsuch. The reason the whalers resisted is that they wished to avoid impressment by the Royal Navy. The crew of out-bound merchantmen and whalers were generally exempt from the Press; the crew of returning vessels, however, were subject to impressment.

== Fate ==
Nonsuch was broken up in 1802.

== Nonsuch in literature ==
A fictitious 74 gun HMS Nonsuch is the flagship in Forester's "Commodore Hornblower". In his novel "Lord Hornblower", set at a later date, she is Captain Bush's ship and supports Hornblower when he takes Le Havre and acts as governor, until Napoleon is defeated at Waterloo.
