= Gardiner and Joseph (ship) =

Two ships have been named Gardiner and Joseph (or Gardener and Joseph, or Gardner and Joseph).

- Gardiner and Joseph (1802 ship) was launched at Hull. She made seven voyages as a whaler in the northern whale fishery until she was wrecked in November 1808.
- Gardiner and Joseph (1810 ship) was launched at Hull. She made 11 voyages to Greenland or Davis Strait as a northern whale fishery whaler. She then traded briefly between Hull and North America. She was last listed in 1825.
