= Seaton Carew Lifeboat Station =

Former lifeboat station in County Durham, England

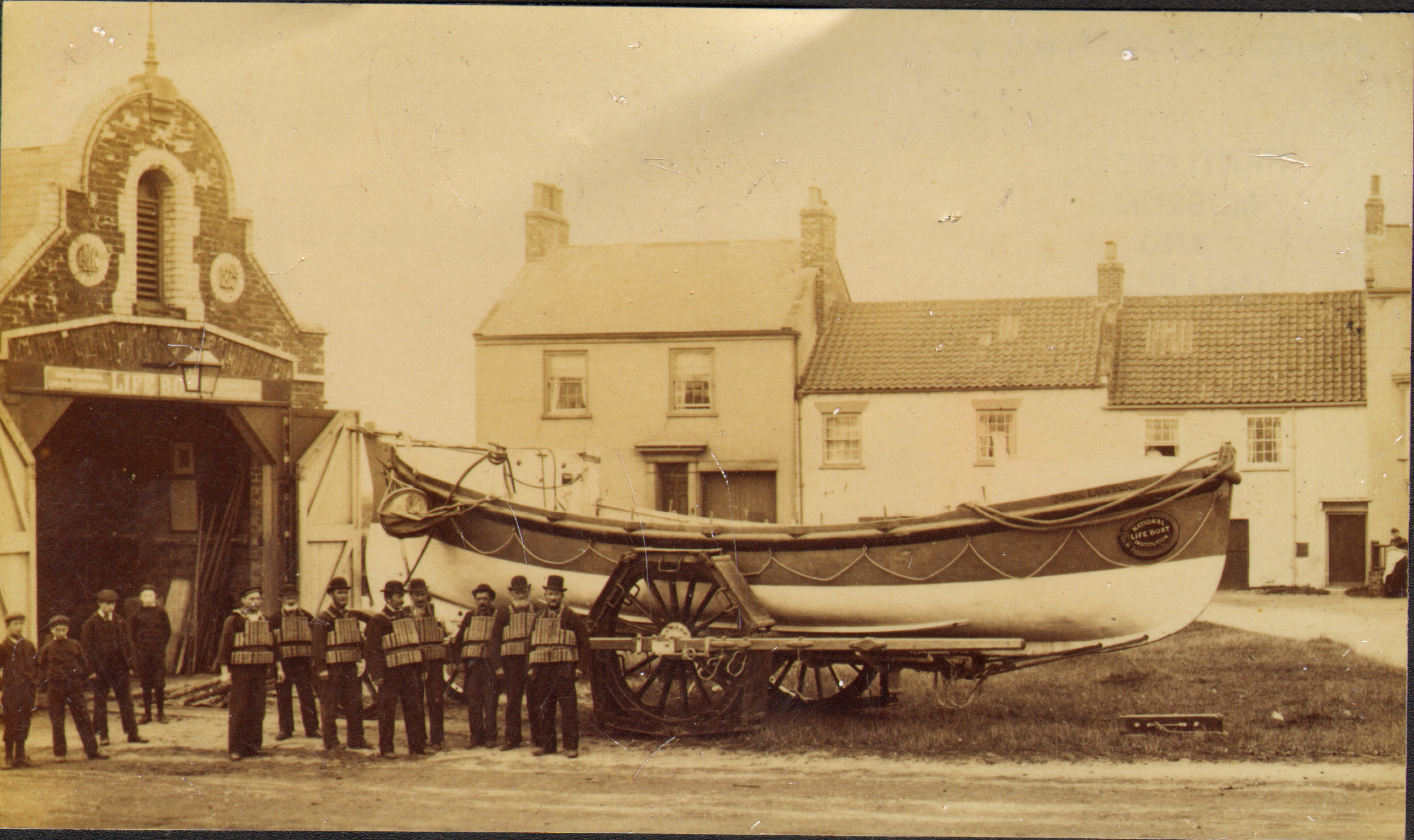
- Seaton Carew Lifeboat and Station

- Seaton Carew, Co. Durham

General information
- Status: Closed
- Type: RNLI Lifeboat Station
- Location: Seaton Carew, County Durham,, England
- Coordinates: 54°39′25.6″N 1°11′11.9″W
- Opened: 1823
- Closed: 1922

Seaton Carew Lifeboat Station was located at the southern end of Front Street, in the town of Seaton Carew, in County Durham.

A lifeboat was first stationed at Seaton Carew in 1823, operated by the Tees Bay Lifeboat and Shipwreck Society (TBLSS). Management of the station was transferred to the Royal National Lifeboat Institution (RNLI) in 1857.

A second station. Seaton Snook Lifeboat Station was operational for just two years, between 1907 and 1909.

Seaton Carew Lifeboat Station closed in 1922.

== History ==
The origins of a lifeboat at Seaton Carew are more set in rumour than fact. It is told that Quaker Thomas Backhouse, a banker from Backhouse's Bank, Darlington, was visiting the town, and witnessed the wreck of a fishing boat. All hands were lost, as a crowd watched on. On hearing a lifeboat would have saved the men, he promised a lifeboat for the town.

Whatever the rumours, records show that a lifeboat was operational at Seaton Carew by 1824. According to the List of shipwrecks in October 1824, no fewer than 11 vessels were driven ashore at Seaton Carew on 11 October 1824. The Sophia of Rostock was wrecked on the North Gar off the mouth of the River Tees, with the loss of the Captain. The survivors were rescued by the Seaton Carew Lifeboat.

No specific details of the lifeboat have been found. By 1825, the lifeboat was being managed by the Tees Bay Lifeboat and Shipwreck Society (TBLSS), which was founded in 1823. In 1847, Hartlepool Lifeboat Society took over the operations of the TBLSS, and in 1857, the responsibility of Seaton Carew lifeboat station was transferred to the RNLI.

The RNLI carried out repairs and alterations to the boathouse, costing £57, and a new 30-foot self-righting 'Pulling and Sailing' (P&S) lifeboat, one with oars and sails, was placed at Seaton Carew in 1857. The lifeboat, carriage and equipment, which cost £180 in total, were transported to Hartlepool free of charge, aboard the collier Killingworth. Funded by a gift from William McKerrell of Bath, Somerset, the boat was named Charlotte after his wife.

The List of shipwrecks in February 1861 shows at least 18 vessels wrecked or driven ashore at Seaton Carew on 9 February, 1861. The Seaton Carew lifeboat Charlotte was first able to rescue eight people from the brig Mayflower, wrecked on the East Gar Sands. Another eight lives were then rescued from the brig Providence, wrecked at Middleton, Hartlepool.

November 1861 was a particularly busy month for the Seaton Carew lifeboat. On 1 November, five crew were rescued from the barque Robert Watson, on passage from Hamburg to Sunderland. On 2 November, she rescued the crew of the barque Rimouski of Russia. The crew of the sloop Welland, driven ashore en route to Newcastle-upon-Tyne, were rescued on 14 November.

In a north east gale on 11 March 1883, the Norwegian schooner Atlas of Drammen, bound for Sunderland with a cargo of ice, had refused a tow by the Shields steam-tug, but had subsequently been blown into Hartlepool Bay. Taken in tow by the Hartlepool steam tug, the line had parted twice, and even with her anchor dropped, she was driven onto Longscar Rocks. The Seaton Carew lifeboat was called at 20:30, but couldn't find the vessel. Coxswain Henry Hood and crewman John Franklin climbed on the rocks. During their search, Hood was washed into the sea, but managed to climb ashore. On finding the wreck, they were joined by crewman Matthew Franklin. The mate of the Atlas was seen and pulled from the surf, and the four remaining crew were transferred to the rocks by line. In perilous conditions, with the sea washing over them, all eight made their way back to the waiting lifeboat. RNLI Silver Medals were awarded to Hood, and both John and Matthew Franklin. Coxswain Henry Hood was subsequently awarded the Albert Medal, Second Class (Bronze) by H.M. Queen Victoria.

Just after 06:00 on 31 January 1907, the steamship Clavering of London stranded on the North Gare breakwater, just after leaving Middlesbrough. The Seaton Carew lifeboat Charles Ingleby (ON 131), on loan to the station from Hartlepool, launched and rescued 15. The Hartlepool No.1 lifeboat Ilminster (ON 242) was brought by road to Seaton Carew at 17:30, and a further attempt by both boats was made later that evening, but abandoned at 02:00. The remaining 24 survivors were rescued in daylight, all landed by 13:00 on 1 February. Coxswains of both lifeboats were awarded the RNLI Silver Medal, one being John Henry Franklin, now Coxswain Superintendent, who had been part of the 1883 rescue.

In 1922, Seaton Carew Lifeboat Station was closed. The lifeboat on station at the time, Francis Whitbourn (ON 576), was retained for demonstration use, finally being sold in 1934. The station building is long since demolished, but the four houses remain, as shown in the picture at the head of this page.

== Seaton Snook ==
In 1857, as the RNLI took over the station at Seaton Carew, it was proposed that a second lifeboat be placed a little further to the south towards Middlesbrough, at Seaton Snook. Permission for a boathouse was granted by landowner Lord Eldon. However, the boathouse was never constructed. It wasn't until fifty years later in 1907, that Seaton Snook Lifeboat Station was established, and an afloat lifeboat was stationed at Canch End. The 42-foot self-righting lifeboat Bradford (ON 350), constructed in 1893, had been converted to be motor-powered, with a 30-hp petrol engine. Mr N. Gale was the appointed mechanic, and a watchman was employed to look after the boat and equipment. The boat was not well liked, proved expensive to run, and suffered mechanical failures. After just two operational years, Seaton Snook Lifeboat Station was closed, and the lifeboat was transferred to Seaham in 1909.

== Station honours ==
The following are awards made at Seaton Carew.

- Albert Medal, Second Class (Bronze)

Henry Hood, Coxswain – 1883

- RNIPLS Silver Medal

William Hood, Coxswain – 1851

Christopher Day, Capt. of Steam Tug Contractor – 1853

- RNLI Silver Medal

Robert Hood, Coxswain – 1863

Henry Hood, Coxswain – 1883
John Henry Franklin, crew member – 1883
Matthew Franklin, crew member – 1883

John Henry Franklin, Coxswain Superintendent – 1907 (Second-Service clasp)

- The Thanks of the Institution inscribed on Vellum

J. Lister – 1867

== Roll of honour ==
In memory of those lost whilst serving Seaton Carew lifeboats.

- Lost when the Trinity House lifeboat capsized on service to the steam-tug Wrecker, 8 December 1866

George Cowell

== Seaton Carew lifeboats ==
=== TBLSS lifeboat ===
| Name | Built | On station | Class | Comments |
|---|---|---|---|---|
| The Tees | 1823 | 1823–1857 | 26-foot 3in North Country | (Note: 26-foot 3in x 9-foot 6in (10-oared) North Country non-self-righting lifeboat, built by Wake of Sunderland, costing £120.) |

=== RNLI lifeboats ===
==== Pulling and Sailing (P&S) lifeboats ====
| ON (Note: ON is the RNLI's Official Number of the boat.) | Name | Built | On station | Class | Comments |
|---|---|---|---|---|---|
| Pre-309 | Charlotte | 1857 | 1857–1867 | 30-foot Peake Self-righting (P&S) | (Note: 30-foot x 7-foot 6in (10-oared) Peake-class self-righting (P&S) lifeboat, gift of Mr Wm. McKerrell of Bath, built by Forrestt of Limehouse, London, costing £159.); Capsized 16 March 1867. |
| Pre-487 | Charlotte | 1867 | 1867–1873 | 33-foot Peake Self-righting (P&S) | (Note: 33-foot x 8-foot 6in (10-oared) Peake-class self-righting (P&S) lifeboat, gift of Mr Wm. McKerrell of Bath, built by Forrestt of Limehouse, London, costing £290.) |
| Pre-575 | Job Hindley | 1873 | 1873–1887 | 33-foot Peake Self-righting (P&S) | (Note: 33-foot x 8-foot 6in (10-oared) Peake-class self-righting (P&S) lifeboat, gift of Mr J. Hindley of Manchester, built by Forrestt of Limehouse, London, costing £324.) |
| 153 | Mary Isabella | 1887 | 1887–1888 | 34-foot Self-righting (P&S) | (Note: 34-foot x 8-foot (10-oared) self-righting (P&S) lifeboat, from RNLI funds, built by Watkins of Blackwall, London, costing £409.) |
| 134 | John Lawson | 1888 | 1888–1906 | 34-foot Self-righting (P&S) | (Note: 34-foot x 8-foot (10-oared) self-righting (P&S) lifeboat, funded by the RNLI, built by Edwards and Symes of Millwall, costing £434.) |
| 131 | Charles Ingleby | 1887 | 1906–1908 | 34-foot Self-righting (P&S) | (Note: 34-foot x 8-foot (10-oared) self-righting (P&S) lifeboat, gift of the trust fund for Rev. C. Ingleby, via Mr G. R. Wragge of Birmingham, built by Edwards and Symes of Millwall, costing £445 when new.); On loan from Hartlepool |
| 576 | Francis Whitbourn | 1907 | 1908–1922 | 35-foot Self-righting (P&S) | (Note: 35-foot x 8-foot 3in (10-oared) self-righting (P&S) lifeboat, gift of Mr R. Lodge of Eastbourne, built by Thames Ironworks of Blackwall, London, costing £802.) |

Station Closed, 1922
Pre ON numbers are unofficial numbers used by the Lifeboat Enthusiast Society, to reference early lifeboats not included on the official RNLI list.

== Seaton Snook lifeboats ==
| ON | Name | Built | On station | Class | Comments |
|---|---|---|---|---|---|
| 350 | Bradford | 1893 | 1907–1909 | 42-foot Self-righting (motor) | (Note: 42-foot x 11-foot self-righting (motor) lifeboat, gift of the Bradford LB fund, built by Woolfe of Shadwell, London, costing £896. Re-engined 1907, Tylor 30-hp.); Previously at Harwich. |

Station Closed, 1909

== See also ==
- List of RNLI stations
- List of former RNLI stations
- Royal National Lifeboat Institution lifeboats
