= HMS Royalist =

Ten ships of the Royal Navy have been named HMS Royalist:

- HMS Royalist (1798) was a gun-vessel of four guns, purchased in 1798 and no longer listed by 1800. This may represent a faulty attribution of HM hired armed lugger Royalist.
- HMS Royalist (1797) was a 14-gun schooner purchased in 1797 and listed until 1801.
- HMS Royalist (1807) was a Cruizer-class brig-sloop of 18 guns, built at Sandwich, Kent in 1807. She had an active career during the Napoleonic Wars and was sold in 1819.
- HMS Royalist (1823) was a Cherokee-class brig-sloop built in 1823 at Portsmouth. She spent much of her life as a tender to battleships and was sold in 1838.
- HMS Royalist (1841) was the ex-Mary Gordon, built at Bombay in 1839 and purchased in China in 1841. She was hulked in 1856, and served the Thames Police between 1860 and 1890.
- HMS Royalist (1861) an 11-gun wood, screw sloop launched at Devonport in 1861 and broken up in 1875.
- HMS Royalist (1883) was a Satellite-class corvette launched 1883. She was hulked as a depot ship in 1900, renamed Colleen in 1913 and transferred to the Irish Free State in 1923. She was scrapped in 1950.
- HMS Royalist (1915) was an Arethusa-class light cruiser launched in 1915. She served in World War I and was scrapped in 1922.
- HMS Royalist (1929) was a Rainbow-class submarine laid down in June 1929 but suspended in August, then cancelled.
- HMS Royalist (89) was a Dido-class cruiser launched in 1942. She served in World War II and was loaned to the Royal New Zealand Navy in 1956. On her return to the Royal Navy in 1967 she was scrapped.
