= Blenheim (1783 ship) =

American privateer; later Royal Navy ship

History

or Massachusetts
- Name: Britannia
- Builder: Philadelphia
- Launched: 1776
- Renamed: American Tartar
- Captured: August 1777

Great Britain
- Name: HMS Hinchinbrook
- Acquired: 9 October 1777 by purchase of a prize
- Fate: Sold 1783

Great Britain
- Name: Blenheim
- Acquired: 1783 by purchase
- Fate: Captured and burnt 1806

General characteristics
- Tons burthen: 300, or 318, or 321, or 331 (bm)
- Complement: Privateer:150–200; Royal Navy:125
- Armament: Privateer; July 1777:20 × 9-pounder + 12 × 4-pounder guns; August 1777:10 × 9-pounder + 8 × 6-pounder guns + 2 × 4-pounder + 4 × 3-poundeer guns; Royal Navy:16 × 6-pounder guns; Whaler:6 × 4-pounder guns
- Notes: Built of live oak and cedar

Blenheim may have been launched in 1776, in Philadelphia as Britannia. By 1777, she was the Massachusetts-based privateer American Tartar and had taken several prizes. She had also participated in an inconclusive single-ship action with a British merchantman. The British Royal Navy captured American Tartar late in 1777, and she became HMS Hinchinbrook. The Royal Navy sold her in 1783, and she became the West Indiaman Blenheim. In 1785-86, she became a Greenland whaler and she continued in that trade until two French frigates captured and burnt her in 1806.

== American privateer ==
The vessel's exact origins are obscure. Lloyd's Register (LR) described her as originating in Philadelphia in 1776. The Register of Shipping gave her origins simply as "BrPlant", i.e., British Plantations (British colonies), in 1777.

Granville Hough stated that the vessel American Tartar had been Britannia, out of New York, but then had become a privateer with a letter of marque from Massachusetts.

Commander John Grimes commissioned American Tartar on 29 November 1776. Her owners were Dean and Joseph Barrell, and other investors.

On 21 May 1777, American Tartar sailed in company with two American frigates, USS Boston and Hancock, for a cruise in the North Atlantic. American Tartar parted from the two frigates shortly thereafter and sailed for northern European waters.

On her way, American Tartar captured the 150-ton (bm) brigantine Sally and sent her into Boston where she was libeled on 17 July.

American Tartar encountered the British merchantman Pole, Maddock, master, on 12 July, at 50°N 20°W (or 56°N 26°W). (Note: Pole, the former Caesar, had a burthen of 250 tons and had been launched at Liverpool in 1768. Her master was J. Maddock, her owner was J. Neilsen, and her trade Liverpool–New York.) Pole was sailing from New York to Liverpool with 40 crew and passengers. American Tartar approached and opened fire. Maddock so maneuvered Pole as to be able three times to clear American Tartar's forecastle. After almost three and a half hours, American Tartar withdrew. Pole, of sixteen 6-pounder guns, had sustained a passenger and two mates wounded.

The next day American Tartar captured two brigs off the Shetland Islands. The first was carrying lumber and hides. The Americans took out her hides and tackle and furnishings, and then burnt her. The second brig was carrying tar. The Americans kept her with them.

On the 15th, American Tartar captured Royal Bounty, of 300 tons (bm), William Kerr, master. She had been sailing from Greenland to Leith. Grimes put a prize crew aboard her, as well as the hides taken from the first brig captured the previous day, and 30 barrels of tar from the second brig. Grimes then released the second brig to her master and crew.

That same day American Tartar captured the ship Janet off the Shetland Islands. Five days later, she captured the ship Nautilus, George Corney, master, off Isle of Lewis. On 28 July, American Tartar was off Norway where she captured the ships Peggy, Thomas, and Elizabeth, and the brig Fanny.

On about 4 August, Grimes sent Royal Bounty to Boston. However, HMS Diamond's tender recaptured Royal Bounty on 22 September, off Cape Ann and sent her into Halifax. The tender was the American privateer schooner Buckram, John Cross, master, that Diamond had captured on 17 September, in Boston Bay.

Capture: HMS Bienfaisant captured American Tartar on 28 August, and sent her into St. John's, Newfoundland and Labrador. Lloyd's List (LL) reported that American Tartar had been armed with 28 guns and had had a crew of 200 men.

== Royal Navy ==
Admiral John Montague purchased American Tartar at Newfoundland on 9 October 1777, and renamed her HMS Hinchinbrook (or Hinchinbroke).

At some point between 1777-1788, Hinchinbrook briefly came under the command of Lieutenant Isaac Schomberg.

Commander John Brudenel (or Bradenel) had commissioned Hinchinbrook in September, but she was not formally registered and renamed until 25 February 1778. In October she was still on the Newfoundland Station. Her captain was Commander John Wainwright.

Hinchinbrook arrived at Woolwich on 18 January 1780. She was then moved to Sheerness on 5 March, to undergo fitting. However, her refitting was cut short and she became a "slop ship", that is, a ship serving to store clothes (slops) for seamen, circa July 1781, when Lieutenant James Screech recommissioned her.

Disposal: The Navy sold Hinchinbrook at Sheerness on 21 March 1783 for £960.

== Mercantile career ==
Blenheim entered Lloyd's Register (LR) in 1783, with G.Kitson, master, E.Snerdon, owner, and trade London–Jamaica. She had undergone a thorough repair in 1783. The entry in the 1784 volume of LR reproduced the same information. However, the entry also carried the annotation that Blenheim was the former man-of-war Hinchinbrook.

Blenheim became a Greenland (Northern Whale) Fisheries whaler. In 1786, she appeared in LR with J. Metcalf, master, W. Walker, owner, and trade London–Greenland. She had undergone a good repair and a damage repair in 1786.

In 1788–89, she fished in Davis Strait. On 20 July 1787, Lloyd's List reported that she was at Davis strait and had taken two "fish". She underwent a repair in 1788 also. LR for 1797 showed Blenheim's master changing from J. Metcalf to R. Maxwell. LR for 1798 showed Blenheim with Maxwell, master, Blaydes, owner, and trade Hull–Davis Strait. She had undergone a good repair in 1796. A handwritten annotation gave the name of a replacement master. "Mitchenson".

The data below are from a database of whaling voyages by Hull-based whalers.

Year	Tuns whale oil	Year	Tuns whale oil
1797	62	1802	57
1798	110	1803	34

Another source gives Blenheim's catch for 1798 as 18 whales, that yielded 310 butts of oil and nine tons 13CWT of whalebone.

The Blenheim affray: As Blenheim was passing through Whitebooth Roads On 30 July 1797, on her way into Hull, the guardships HMS Nonsuch and Redoubt fired several shots as a signal for Blenheim to stop. She did not. Her crew, fearing the press gang, had locked her master, William Mitchenson, and the pilot in the cabin. The guardships then sent three boats to board Blenheim, but her crew resisted with their long lances and harpoons, preventing the navy men from boarding. Next Nautilus fired some 30 shots, to no avail, and sent a boat. Blenheim ran aground and the boats from the navy vessels surrounded her. As a boat from Nonsuch again tried to come alongside, the crew of Blenheim fired a swivel gun loaded with grapeshot, and again wielded their lances. Another account reports that Blenheim's crew pelted the navy men with spears, capstan bars, handspikes, other offensive weapons, and also several large iron shot. They succeeded in wounding the lieutenant commanding the boat, who survived, and two seamen, who died of their wounds. When the boats from the naval vessels withdrew, the crew aboard Blenheim slipped ashore and disappeared. The Admiralty offered a reward of £100 for the apprehension of the men who had killed the two seamen, but no one came forward. The government also promised to pardon all of the members of the crew other than those that had actually murdered the two men from Nonsuch. The reason the whalers resisted is that they wished to avoid impressment by the Royal Navy. The crew of out-bound merchantmen and whalers were generally exempt from the Press; the crew of returning vessels, however, were subject to impressment.

On 13 March 1800, the government charged Captain Mitchinson with murder for the deaths in 1798, of the two seamen. The government argued that the restraint the crew had put on Mitchinson were a sham. Witnesses testified that the restraints were real, and that there had been no collusion. Mitchinson was acquitted.

Year	Tuns whale oil	Year	Tuns whale oil
1799	95	1804	89.5
1800	Note: undergoing rebuilding	1805	120
1801	34.5	1806	Note: captured and burnt

Another source shows that rather than being captured and burnt in 1801, Blenheim, Webster, master, had killed two whales that yielded 90 butts or 36 tons of whale oil, and one ton of whale bone.

Year	Master	Owner	Trade	Source and notes
1805	J. Welburn	Blaydes	Hull–Greenland	LR; rebuilt in 1800
1805	J. Welburn	T. Barnaby	Hull–Greenland	RS; rebuilt in 1800

== Fate ==
On 2 August 1806, Sirène, capitaine de frégate Le Duc, and Revanche, capitaine de frégate Lambert, captured the Greenland whalers Holderness, Swan, master, and Blenheim, Welburn, master, both of and for Hull. The French burnt their captures.
