= Philippe d'Auvergne =

Royal Navy admiral (1754–1816)

Vice-Admiral Philippe d'Auvergne
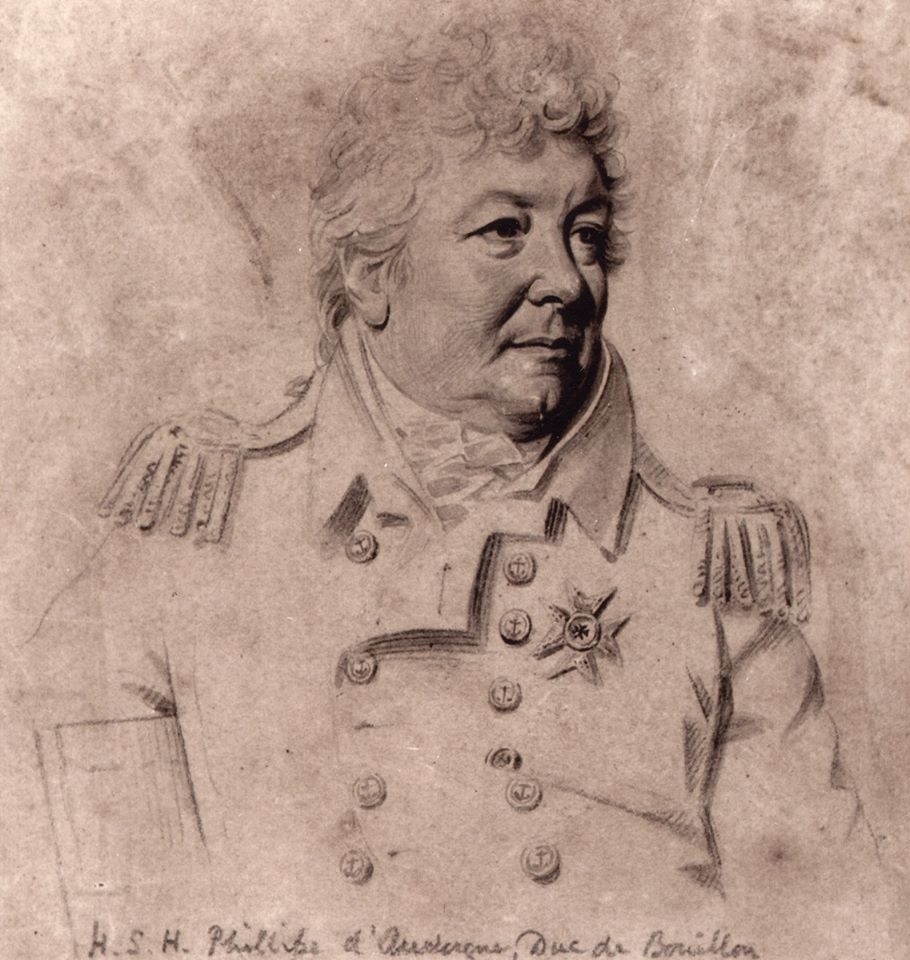
- Portrait of d'Auvergne
- Born: 13 November 1754; Jersey, Channel Islands
- Died: 18 September 1816 (aged 61); London, England
- Military career
- Allegiance: Great Britain; United Kingdom
- Branch: Royal Navy
- Service years: 1775–1816
- Rank: Vice-admiral
- Conflicts: American War of Independence; French Revolutionary Wars; Napoleonic Wars

Vice-Admiral Philippe d'Auvergne (13 November 1754 – 18 September 1816) was a Royal Navy officer who served in the American War of Independence and French Revolutionary and Napoleonic Wars. D'Auvergne also worked as a spymaster for British intelligence, engaging in plots to destabilise the French First Republic's control over Brittany and Normandy which included printing counterfeit money to cause hyperinflation.

== Early life ==
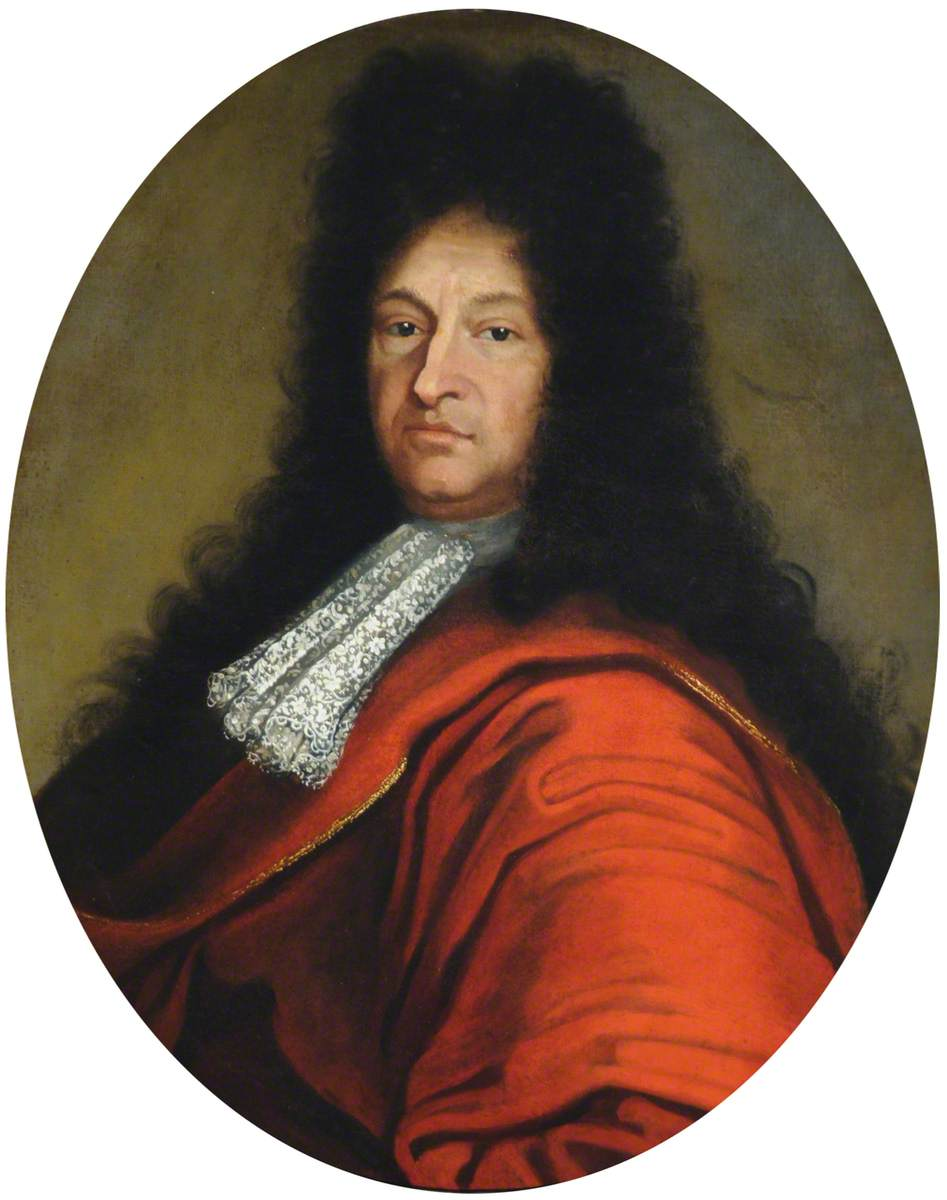
Philippe's maternal ancestor, Philippe Le Geyt (1655–1716), Lieutenant Bailiff of Jersey

Philippe D'Auvergne was born in Jersey, where his family had lived for four centuries. His mother Elizabeth Le Geyt (d. 1754), the daughter of Philippe Le Geyt, Lieut-Bailiff of Jersey from 1729 to 1746, died giving birth to him. His father, Charles Dauvergne (1724–1797), was an ex-British Army officer, advisor to British Cabinet Committees and aide-de-camp to various Governors; they included John Huske, Governor from 1749 to 1761, who left Charles £2,000 when he died in January 1761. His younger half brother, Corbet James D'Auvergne (born 1767), also joined the Royal Navy, and was associated with Jane Austen.

D'Auvergne was educated in Jersey, then England and France. He was fluent in French and English and had a mathematical mind, later to be used in various scientific studies and research. Much of his youth was spent sailing around the coast of Jersey.

== Navy ==
D'Auvergne joined the Royal Navy, and became a midshipman in 1770. He was trained aboard the Royal Yacht HMS Mary, under the command of Captain John Campbell. The Royal Yacht was used as a training vessel, for picked men. This was far easier than the usual training on a man-of-war. Accounts of Philippe's life put this down to Earl Howe, later Vice Admiral of England and First Lord of the Admiralty. Howe had befriended Charles d'Auvergne, whilst commanding the flotilla stationed at Jersey during 1756.

Philippe's next vessel was HMS Flora, where he is reported as meeting Empress Catherine of Russia; and on a return trip was influenced by a French scientific team at Copenhagen. Throughout this time Philippe studied mathematics and tried to solve the problem of time keeping and barometric pressure at sea.

=== Arctic expedition ===
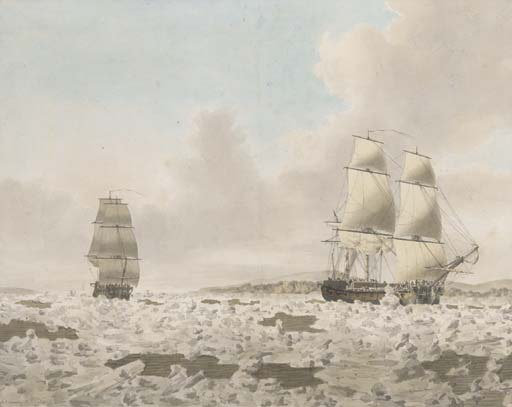
Racehorse and Carcass forcing through the ice, 1774 watercolour by John Cleveley the Younger based on sketches by d'Auvergne

During 1773, the Admiralty commissioned an expedition to the Arctic, to further science and knowledge. Two sloops were refitted for the expedition and on 4 June 1773 the Carcass and Racehorse set sail for the North.

The muster roll for Racehorse lists Philippe d'Auvergne as a midshipman. Onboard Carcass was a 15-year-old midshipman, named Horatio Nelson.

The expedition failed to find the Northwest Passage, but they had sailed further north than any previous expedition, approximately 80°48′N 20°0′E, a position just north of Svalbard. This and the scientific experiments carried out meant the expedition was seen as a success.

During 1774 d'Auvergne continued his scientific education and also prepared sketches for the journal Voyage towards the North Pole by Captain Constantine Phipps, 2nd Baron Mulgrave.

=== American War of Independence ===
By 1775 d'Auvergne was assigned to HMS Asia, and he is recorded as discharging to HMS Kingfisher on 27 August 1775. Asia was assigned to the fleet at Boston Harbour, to support British forces against the American militia.

D'Auvergne, still a midshipman, was ordered to take charge of one of the boats carrying soldiers to attack Lexington. Paul Revere had already warned the Yankees of the attack, resulting in the British force of 800 being reduced by 73 dead and 185 injured by the pursuing American militia. D'Auvergne continued to command boats carrying troops around Boston and on 17 June 1775 after transporting troops, watched the ensuing Battle of Bunker Hill. He was on board one of the ships that bombarded and burnt Falmouth.

Appointed acting Lieutenant, D'Auvergne went with the Chatham which landed troops on Long Island, he was commanding a number of flat bottomed boats with hinged gateways, before crossing to Manhattan Island under fire. D'Auvergne was next assigned to HMS Preston, under the command of Admiral Shuldham, commander of the fleet in Boston Harbour. The Admiral was impressed with this young acting Lieutenant and d'Auvergne was commissioned as a Lieutenant on 2 June 1777 and was given Alarm, an eight-gun galley, to command. On 25 October 1777 d'Auvergne captured the Delaware with a company of Grenadiers; and on 27 May 1778 landed a party of marines at Fogland Ferry, successfully destroying the guard house.

By late 1778 France and Spain had signed a treaty of alliance with the American colonies. When French frigates entered Rhode Island, d'Auvergne carried out his written orders and scuttled Alarm on 30 July 1778. Now ashore, d'Auvergne was made a Major of the Naval Brigade. The court martial of d'Auvergne for the loss of his vessel is reported as being aboard HMS Royal Oak, 28 September 1778. The court martial acquitted d'Auvergne, the British had been forced to scuttle ten vessels in all, including Flora.

=== Prisoner of war ===
After returning to England, d'Auvergne was assigned to HMS Arethusa as First Lieutenant. On 18 March 1779 Arethusa fought the French vessel Aigrette for two hours off Ushant, but during the engagement a larger French line-of-battle ship was spotted and Arethusa broke off. In the dim light she struck a rock off the coast of Molène. Of the 200 crew, thirteen escaped, apparently never to be seen again, and the remainder were taken prisoner, and interned in Carhaix, Brittany.

== Duke of Bouillon ==
Godefroy Charles Henri de la Tour d'Auvergne, the Duke of Bouillon was looking for someone to adopt as the Duke's only surviving son, Jacques Leopold, was seriously disabled and unable to father an heir to the throne. One choice for an heir was a Breton soldier, Théophile Malo Corret, who claimed descent of an illegitimate half brother to Henri de la Tour d'Auvergne, the Marshal of France. Theophile was from Carhaix and mentioned that a Philippe d'Auvergne was being held prisoner. This chance comment intrigued the Duke, parole was secured and Philippe d'Auvergne travelled in February 1780 to the Château de Navarre in Évreux, Normandy to meet the Duke. He was provided with clothes suitable for a Royal Court and in fluent French told the Duke of his adventures to date.

Returned to prison, Philippe d'Auvergne was quickly exchanged and returned to England. The Duke had liked him and hired genealogists to link the Jersey Dauvergnes with the French principality.

== Further naval duties ==
D'Auvergne was exchanged with French prisoners of war and returned to England in the spring of 1780, In June he was appointed to HMS Lark. During March 1781 Lark sailed as part of an invasion fleet against the Cape of Good Hope under the command of Commodore George Johnston. They were sent to punish the Dutch for their alliance with the French.

On 16 April 1781 the fleet stopped at Porto Praya to take on water and fresh supplies. While the British fleet was at anchor the French fleet, sent to help the Dutch, entered the harbour and attacked the British. After an inconclusive battle the French broke off. After a brief pursuit, Commodore Johnstone chose to stay and make repairs to the damaged ships, enabling the French fleet to reach the Cape first.

The British fleet failed to land at the Cape, but they did capture five Dutch East Indiamen in the "battle" of Saldanha Bay before heading back to England. During this expedition d'Auvergne made a report to Commodore Johnstone of the intelligence that Active had gathered from her capture on 1 July of the Dutch East Indiaman Heldwoltenlade, which had left Saldanha on 28 June, intelligence that led to the capture of the Dutch ships. Johnstone described d'Auvergne as a "very promising young officer".

=== Trindade and Martim Vaz ===
D'Auvergne was promoted on 21 August 1781 to Master and Commander and took command of a ten gun cutter HMS Rattlesnake, allowing the former captain of Rattlesnake to return to London on Lark.

On 30 September, Rattlesnake, Mercury, and Jupiter captured the French ship Philippine. The prize money was remitted from Jamaica, suggesting the capture took place in the Caribbean. French records have the capture occurring in the Antilles. (Note: Philippine was a French merchant vessel purchased by Bernard & Cie. at Lorient for Lt160,000 and commissioned 11 March 1781 by the French navy. She was fitted out between March and April. She had a crew of 100. French reports indicate that the British treated the crew harshly after they became prisoners.)

Rattlesnake and Jupiter were sent to survey Trindade and Martim Vaz, to establish the islands suitability for a base for outward-bound Indiamen. The islands are volcanic with nothing but turtle doves and land crabs. On the evening of 21 October 1781 during a heavy storm, Rattlesnake lost her anchor rope and in trying to get to sea struck a rock and was run ashore; Jupiter picked up five sailors. Commodore Johnstone had previously wished to colonise the island and claim it for Britain, so d'Auvergne agreed to stay on the tiny island with 30 sailors, 20 captured French sailors, one woman, some animals and supplies.

A supply ship arrived in January 1782 and the news of Rattlesnake's loss arrived in England on 5 February. Then the castaways appear to have been forgotten.

D'Auvergne and his people remained on the island until 27 December 1782, when by chance, HMS Bristol, escorting East Indiamen, passed by. D'Auvergne fired distress signals and she rescued the 30 sailors, 20 Frenchmen, and the woman. D'Auvergne and the surviving crew were taken to Madras, India. A second Court Martial took place regarding the loss of Rattlesnake and d'Auvergne was absolved of any liability for the loss and commended for the most extraordinary command he had been given by a superior.

=== India ===
Whilst in India D'Auvergne met Muhammed Ali Khan Wallajah, the Nawab of Arcot. Muhammed had gone into debt helping the British against the French. This caused the British East India Company to claim most of his state, claiming an annual income from the Nawab. The Nawab asked d'Auvergne to make a petition to the King to reclaim his state. D'Auvergne, on his return, made the petition in 1783. The petition was successful and the state returned to the Nawab.

It was reported that D'Auvergne married whilst in India, but the India Office Records held by the British Library have no record of a marriage. Although there is a marriage of a Philip d'Auvergne to an Anne Lowrie in 1800, the individual in question was a captain in the army. (Note: Philippe d'Auvergne was in Jersey at this time.)

=== Peace ===
On his return to England d'Auvergne was promoted to captain, but the peace with France meant demobilisation.

Between 1784 and 1787 d'Auvergne spent time travelling and escorted John Townsend son of Thomas Townshend, 1st Viscount Sydney on a Grand Tour. D'Auvergne obtained an honorary degree in 1785 and elected Fellow of the Royal Society on 11 June 1786. In 1787 he was appointed a Revenue officer in Jersey, on board HMS Narcissus, a post he continued in until 1789 when he asked to be relieved due to ill health.

The Duke of Bouillon had now found a way to connect the families, using the reported arrival of the d'Auvergne family in the Channel Islands during the 13th century. In the 14th century Thiébaut d'Auvergne obtained a grant of land in Jersey and the family remained there until the 18th century. In 1787 the adoption was agreed by King George and notices were published in The London Gazette. D'Auvergne was now known as the Prince of Bouillon, and would be Duke of Bouillon if Jacques Léopold de La Tour d'Auvergne died without issue. With this new title came an offer of French naturalisation, d'Auvergne rejected this offer, stating he would never betray his sovereign. D'Auvergne visited the Duke in 1790 and found the Duke had married the 14-year-old daughter of his mistress. If this new wife produced a boy, d'Auvergne would not inherit. However, the Duke was not well and officially confirmed d'Auvergne as the Prince-Successor, which George III confirmed on 27 February 1792. The Supreme Council of Bouillon did not confirm the appointment, stating it did not comply with French law; this would have future consequences.

During this period d'Auvergne also assisted Channel Island merchants in securing convoys for their shipping.

== French Revolution ==
In 1793, at the beginning of the French Revolution, d'Auvergne was based in London. The Governor of Jersey Alexander Lindsay had opened communications between England and the Royalists. Lindsay was then transferred to Jamaica in 1794.

=== Administrateur des Secours Accordés aux Émigrés (Administrator of Relief Grants to Emigres) ===
By 1794, after a petition from the Defence Committee of the Islands, and a letter from d'Auvergne to the Admiralty, he was appointed as commander of the floating battery Nonsuch and Senior of Officer of Gunboats in Jersey. Several gunboats formed his flotilla: Repulse, Lion, Scorpion, Tiger and Eagle. The ships were not purpose-built men of war, but rather small former Dutch hoys converted to gun-vessels. The crew were mainly from Jersey, as Englishmen did not want to serve on them, there being little opportunity for prize money. Merchants and locals on Jersey provided the money to defray the extra costs to support the flotilla. The vessels were not effective and the Navy withdrew them, selling most. Nonesuch was paid off in December 1794, but the Navy replaced her with the 16-gun floating battery Bravo, which the Navy re-rated as a 28-gun sixth-rate frigate to increase d'Auvergne's salary as her commander and commander of the flotilla. To replace the hoys, d'Auvergne received the services of the hired armed vessels Daphne, Royalist, and Aristocrat. (Note: The commander of Aristocrat was Lieutenant Corbet James d'Auvergne.)

With this responsibility d'Auvergne was asked, in September 1794, to assume the role Alexander Lindsay had started. A manuscript memorial to the War Office, held by the Library in Jersey, shows his duties as:

- To command a division of armed vessels to cover the Islands.
- Open communications with the continent, to obtain information on hostile enemy movements.
- Maintain communications with the insurgents in Western Provinces.
- To distribute succours (sic; assistance) to the lay French emigrants in the Islands.

In addition to his government duties, d'Auvergne distributed £122,031 of non-government monies to thousands of émigrés who had fled through Jersey, obtaining receipts for every penny spent and passing an audit with praise. He also established a school for the émigré children.

=== Spymaster in revolutionary era ===
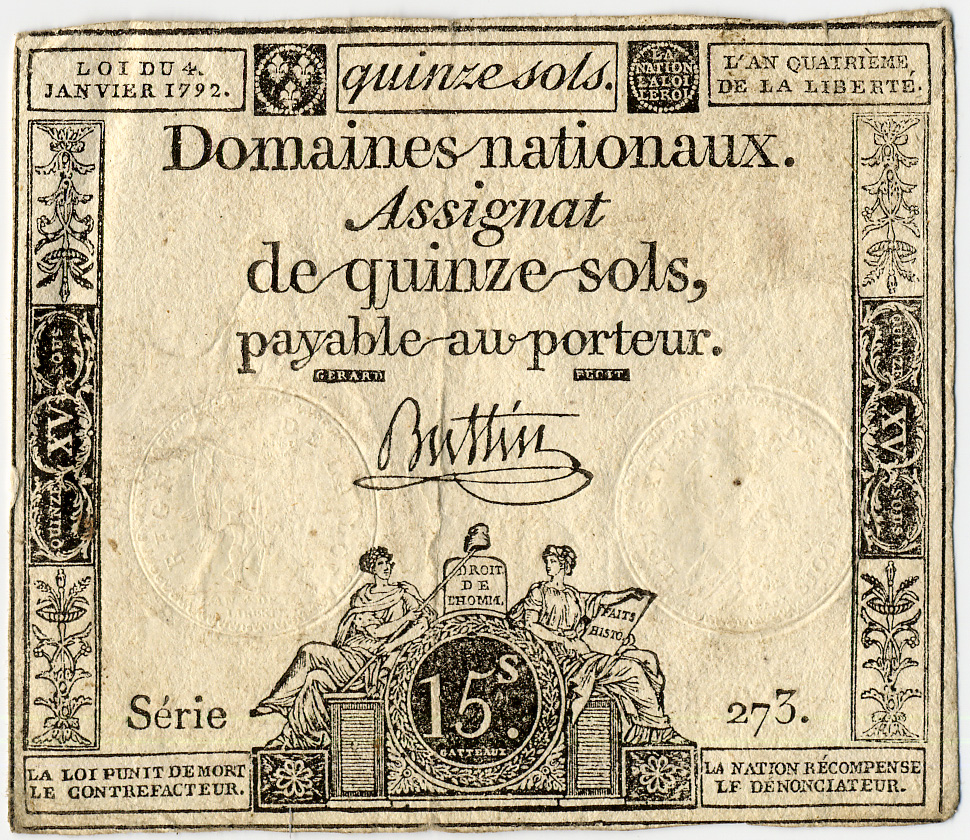
Assignat of 4 January 1792, still bearing Royal markings: 15 sols

Provided with £30,000 a month by the secret service of the British government to use to cause unrest in France and to whom he reported directly, the communications with the French Royalists was maintained by a network of spies, and insurgents whilst smuggling arms, ammunition and supplies across the short stretch of water to the French mainland. The authorities in Jersey were suspicious of d'Auvergne who was reporting directly to London and of the émigrés in Jersey at a time of threatened invasion, émigrés were required to wear a white ribbon and obey a curfew.

Jersey was an excellent base for d'Auvergne, who erected on a tower, the Prince's tower as it became called, that he had owned since 1754 at La Hougue Bie, a signal station, the masts of which could be clearly seen from the French coast. The smuggling of people with forged documents and materiel into France together with forged French Assignat notes, which were being mass-produced in London with the successful result of causing hyperinflation which raged in France until 1802.

From 1795 he was given complete access to Mont Orgueil castle as a base, this reinforced Gorey harbour as the base for the ships d'Auvergne used to transport people and goods to France, messages were sometimes routed for/from French fishermen through secure drops on isolated rocks or in a lobster pot. Not only was d'Auvergne involved in the administration of French Emigres who had flocked to Jersey and passing intelligence to London, he also supported the attempted invasion at Quiberon. British and émigré forces landed at Quiberon to support the Chouans and the French Royalist and Catholic Armies on 21 July 1795.

The invading force was led by General Comte Joseph de Puisaye. Puisaye was under the command of Comte D'Artois of the House of Bourbon, whilst his second in command, Louis Charles d'Hervilly, was under the command of Louis XVIII, of the House of Orleans. The invasion started well, the forces landed without incident and they had the element of surprise, but d'Hervilly produced a letter to take command of the force. This fight for command, Puisaye won eventually, allowed the French Republican forces to counterattack and the Royalist forces were forced to retreat. An intercepted report stated that all the men from Quiberon (approximately 750 men) were executed at Auray, these were mainly nobles of Louis XVIII. A chapel now stands on the site, known as Champ des Martyrs. General Puisaye was accused of desertion.

Neither d'Auvergne nor the Comte de Puisaye seem to have trusted each other, with Puisaye trying to avoid Jersey, and deliver directly to London. d'Auvergne continued to ask Henry Dundas if he should send arms to Puisaye. After Puisaye returned to Jersey he retired from the military and headed for Canada.

A regular visitor to Jersey was Georges Cadoudal, the Chouan leader implicated in an attempt on Christmas Eve 1800 to assassinate Napoleon Bonaparte, in rue Saint-Nicaise Paris. A barrel of gunpowder concealed in a water cart was detonated as Bonaparte's carriage went by, but it was ignited too late, and the First Consul was only showered with broken glass.

== Claims to the throne of Bouillon ==
=== First claim to throne of Bouillon ===
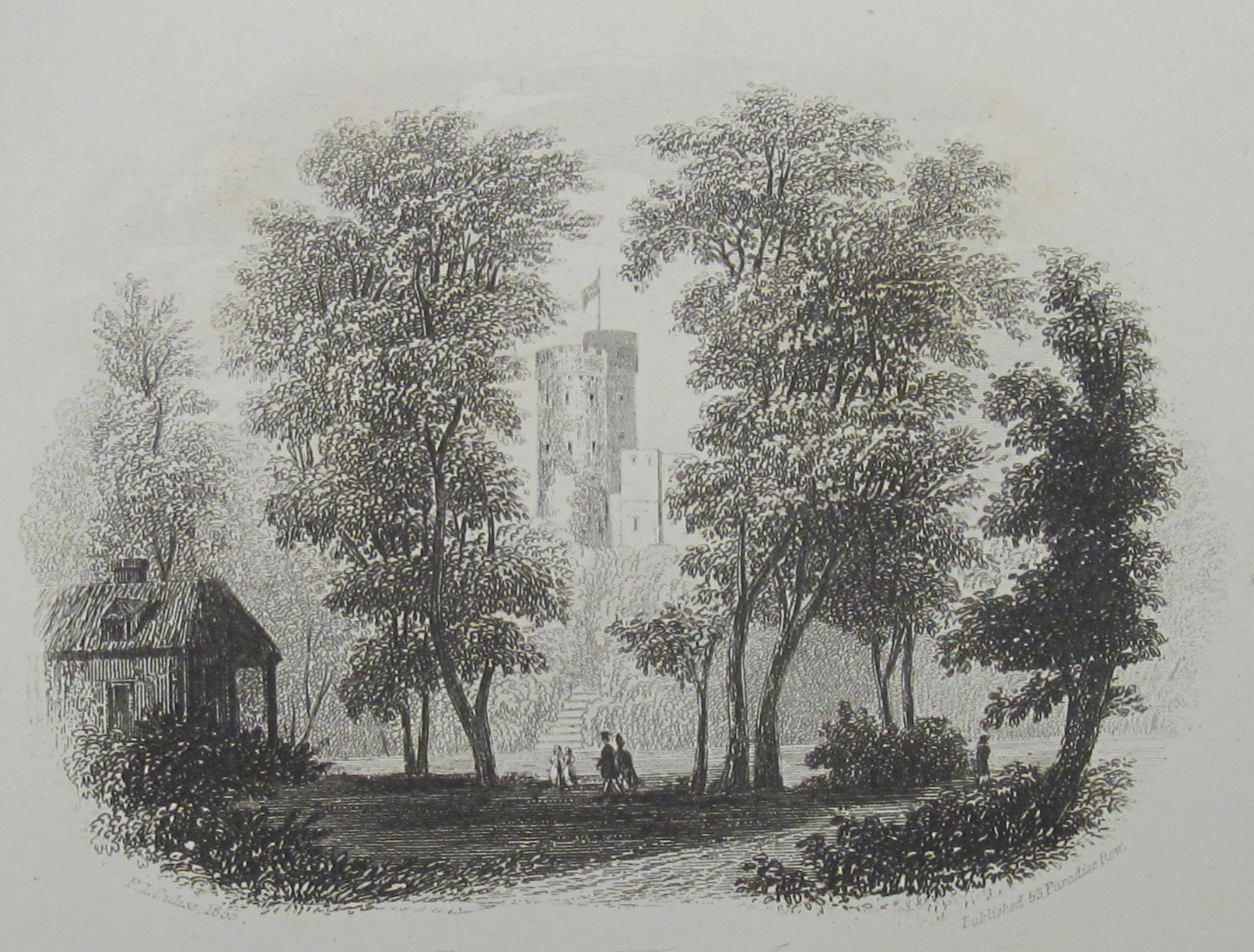
The Prince's Tower, d'Auvergne's gothic residence, as depicted by Philip John Ouless in 1855

D'Auvergne lost the command of Jersey with the peace with France. His role was a wartime role, with peace came a Captain's half pay. He now spent his time in his house and gardens on Jersey, even opening the gardens to the public. His library contained 4,000 volumes, from scientific to classic, to French history. From 1792 he developed a neo-Gothic construction at La Hougue Bie known as the Prince's Tower. The mediaevalist architecture of the tower (originally to be called La Tour d'Auvergne as a symbolic motif of his adopted family name) supported both his claims to ancestry and his interest in fashionable architecture of the day.

His promotions raised him to Vice-Admiral of the Red. In Bouillon the French had annexed the Duchy of Bouillon in 1795, and Duke Godefroy III, died in 1794, his son Jacques Leopold La Tour d'Auvergne inherited the title of Duke. Jacques Leopold died on 3 March 1802 without issue, and Philippe d'Auvergne used the full title and dignity of Duke after this date.

After the Peace of Amiens on 25 March 1802, d'Auvergne headed to Paris to fight a claim by another apparent heir, but on his arrival, the French police, knowing of his actions in Jersey, dragged him from his hotel without any charge, or any explanation and threw him in jail. Correspondence from Mr Merry, Ambassador in Paris, complains of the French authorities actions and states that d'Auvergne was held for five days, and when released was given only 24 hours to leave France, a near impossibility at that time. Questions were raised in Parliament, but no further action was taken as they did not wish to upset the latest peace.

=== Spymaster in Napoleonic era ===
D'Auvergne returned to Jersey. By 1802 the émigrés had been given a way to return home, as Napoleon Bonaparte had taken control of France, and granted the émigrés amnesty. Many signed the declaration offered and returned. D'Auvergne continued to collect intelligence from France, including the buildup of forces at Brest, where Bonaparte was massing a force to assist the Irish in their fight against the British. D'Auvergne's ring of spies was diminishing as either they were captured, or signed Napoleon's declaration. In 1803 he was given HMS Severn a 44-gun Adventure-class frigate to reinforce Jersey defences, however it was wrecked next year in a gale.

Some of the spies continued to travel across the sea to France, and one was Noel Prigent, experienced in landing in France; he had journeyed across the sea over 150 times. In 1807 d'Auvergne was informed of the Chouans wanting to rise and rebel again, so Prigent and companions were sent to France to gain intelligence. On their arrival they found no signs of a possible uprising or even anyone willing to assist them. All the usual safe houses were closed to them. Prigent and his companions spent a number of weeks travelling around Brittany and living in ditches, and after a number of failed attempts to return to Jersey, one of the companions, Bouchard, gave himself up to the French. Bouchard then led the Secret Police to Prigent and his companions. As soon as Prigent was captured, he gave up every detail he knew about the correspondence, including landing places, codes and safe houses used by d'Auvergne's spies.

Bouchard then agreed to return to Jersey and persuade d'Auvergne that he was sent by Prigent. D'Auvergne welcomed him and sent Bouchard back to France with letters to General Puisaye, and further correspondence to Prigent. Bouchard had asked that Comte Vaucouleurs be despatched to France, and shortly afterwards he left for the French coast. He was arrested as soon as he landed. Armand de Chateaubriand followed in September 1808, but it was apparent that everyone was behind Napoleon. No-one would support Chateaubriand, and after a couple of failed attempts to return to Jersey, Chateaubriand was arrested and along with 10 other émigrés shot. The efforts of Bouchard and Prigent to save their own lives also failed, as they were shot on Bonaparte's orders. Even the Comte d'Artois was indicating he should have sole control of the correspondence. Any hope of a new Royalist revolution was never going to materialise.

1808 saw d'Auvergne promoted to rear admiral and put in charge of naval ships in the Channel Islands although as he was not afloat, could not benefit from prize monies. In 1809 Napoleon confirmed an order to confiscate all assets of the Bouillon family, granting d'Auvergne's Château de Navarre to his divorced wife, Josephine. Promoted to vice admiral, d'Auvergne stood down from his role in 1812, possibly due to ill health, possibly aware of the next period of peace and put on half pay.

=== Second claim to the throne of Bouillon ===
In 1814 the Comte d'Artois, of the House of Bourbon, was proclaimed King Louis XVIII. When d'Auvergne visited him in Paris, the King agreed to support d'Auvergne's claim to the Duchy of Bouillon, due to all the support he had given to the Royalists over the last 20 years. The officials of the Duchy took an oath to d'Auvergne as the 8th Duc de Bouillon and he was formally declared Prince of Bouillon.

On hearing Napoleon had returned to power in 1815, d'Auvergne went to Brussels and marched to war with a small regiment formed in the colours of Bouillon. Nine days before the Battle of Waterloo, d'Auvergne discovered that the Congress of Vienna, which was allowed by the Treaty of Paris to rewrite the map of Europe, had decided to form the United Kingdom of the Netherlands as a buffer state along the northern border of France. This meant there was no place for an independent principality and the Duchy of Bouillon would be annexed to the Grand Duchy of Luxembourg (at that time considered part of the Kingdom of the Netherlands due to the personal union of the two states).

Although the independence of the Duchy was lost, there were rights to the estates (including some in France), however further complications came in the form of another claimant to the throne, Prince Charles de Rohan (who was a grandson of a half-sister of the 6th Duke). Things looked good for d'Auvergne since he had the backing of Lord Castlereagh and the Congress had rejected a similar case. With everyone watching events that would lead to Waterloo, the Congress decided that the King of the Netherlands should rule on the case, and left the ruling to arbitrators and the King. Whilst d'Auvergne was away, the Congress decided to uphold the arbitrators decision in favor of the claim by Rohan, the blood relation.

== Death ==
D'Auvergne returned to London, the security for his personal loans having been lost, he was bankrupt, owing £12,000 in Jersey alone. He died at Holmes' Hotel, London, on 18 September 1816; he was buried in St. Margaret's Church, Westminster.

An inventory of his house and library from the auction of his estate are held by the Jersey Archives. The Duchy of Bouillon remained in upheaval until 1825 when it was divided between the last Duke of Bourbon, the Prince de La Trémoille and the Princesse de Poix.

Philippe d'Auvergne died with the titles:

- Monsignor His Serene Highness Philippe d'Auvergne, by the Grace of God and the will of his people, Duc de Bouillon.
- Vicomte de Turenne.
- Duc d'Albret and de Chateau Thierry.
- Comte d'Auvergne.
- Comte d'Évreux et du bas Armagnac.
- Baron de la Tour, Oliergues, Maringues and Montgacon, Peer of France.
- Knight of Order of Saint Joachim.

Most of these titles died with him.

== Descendants ==
D'Auvergne fathered three illegitimate children by Mary Hepburn of St. Helier, Jersey, to whom he gave his name: Mary Ann Charlotte (b. 1794), married in 1815 to Sir Henry Prescott, later Admiral; Anne Elizabeth (b. 1800), married to Admiral John Aplin; and Philip, who died a midshipman aboard HMS Africaine at Colombo in 1815, and was buried 19 March 1815 at St Peters ("The Fort").

== Notes, references and bibliography ==
Notes

Citations

References

- Ashelford, Jane (2008) In the English Service, the Life of Philippe d'Auvergne, Jersey Heritage Trust, ISBN 978-0955250880
- Balleine, George Reginald (1973) The Tragedy of Philippe d'Auvergne, Vice-Admiral in the Royal Navy and Last Duke of Bouillon. (Chichester: Phillimore).
- Chalon, Renier-Hubert-Ghislain (1860) Le dernier duc de Bouillon. (Bruxelles: E. Devroye)
- Davies, Kenneth Gordon. Documents of the American Revolution 1770–1783, (Colonial Office Series), Irish University Press (1972–1981)
- Kirke, Henry (1904) From the Gun Room to the Throne.
- "Temps passé: Philippe d'Auvergne". 4 December 2008.
- "D'Auvergne, Philippe (d.1816) Prince de Bouillon". National Archives. 2012.
