= List of shipwrecks in October 1824 =

The list of shipwrecks in October 1824 includes some ships sunk, wrecked or otherwise lost during October 1824.

== 1 October ==
List of shipwrecks: 1 October 1824
Ship	State	Description
King David	United Kingdom	The ship collided with Hebina (Bremen) in the North Sea and foundered. Her crew were rescued by Hebina. King David was on a voyage from King's Lynn, Norfolk to Tønder, Denmark.
Mayflower	United Kingdom	The ship was lost off Uist, Outer Hebrides She was on a voyage from "Pettenweem" to Leith, Lothian.

== 2 October ==
List of shipwrecks: 2 October 1824
Ship	State	Description
Charles	United Kingdom	The ship sprang a leak and foundered in the Atlantic Ocean. Her crew were rescued by a French chasse-marée. She was on a voyage from Antwerp, Netherlands to Lisbon, Portugal and Gibraltar.
Twee Vreinden	Netherlands	The ship was wrecked on the Elleboog Bank, in the North Sea. Her crew survived. She was on a voyage from Antwerp to London, United Kingdom.

== 3 October ==
List of shipwrecks: 3 October 1824
Ship	State	Description
Brothers	United Kingdom	The ship was wrecked on Thistlerna, Sweden. Her crew were rescued. She was on a voyage from South Shields, County Durham to Riga, Russia.
Helen Maxwell	United Kingdom	The ship was driven ashore and wrecked at Dunnet Head, Caithness. She was on a voyage from Dumfries to Wick, Caithness.
Sisters	United Kingdom	The brig departed from Liverpool, Lancashire for the Clyde. No further trace, presumed foundered in the Irish Sea with the loss of all hands.

== 4 October ==
List of shipwrecks: 4 October 1824
Ship	State	Description
Amphion	United States	The ship was wrecked in the River Plate. She was on a voyage from New York to Rio de Janeiro, Brazil.

== 5 October ==
List of shipwrecks: 5 October 1824
Ship	State	Description
Amelia	United Kingdom	The ship was wrecked near Figueira, Portugal. Her crew were rescued.
Frigga	Sweden	The ship departed from Lisbon, Portugal for Borgå. No further trace, presumed foundered with the loss of all hands.
Maria	United Kingdom	The ship was wrecked in the Atlantic Ocean with the loss of eight lives. Survivors were rescued on 16 October by Portaferry (United Kingdom). She was on a voyage from Quebec City, Lower Canada, British North America to Milford Haven, Pembrokeshire.

== 6 October ==
List of shipwrecks: 6 October 1824
Ship	State	Description
Svir (Свирь)	Imperial Russian Navy	The sloop-of-war was driven ashore and wrecked on ru:Nerva in the Gulf of Finland. Her crew were rescued by the brig Olimp (Олимп, 'Olympus', Imperial Russian Navy). She was on a voyage from Reval to Kronstadt.

== 8 October ==
List of shipwrecks: 8 October 1824
Ship	State	Description
Asia	United Kingdom	The ship was driven ashore and wrecked on Faial Island, Azores. Her crew were rescued.
Lerwick Packet	United Kingdom	The ship was driven ashore and wrecked at Grutness, Shetland Islands.
Tres Amigos	Portugal	The ship was lost with the loss of three of her crew. She was on a voyage from "St. George's" to Lisbon.

== 9 October ==
List of shipwrecks: 9 October 1824
Ship	State	Description
Dame Colotte	Netherlands	The brig was driven ashore crewless at Praia da Marinha, Portugal.
Gardner & Joseph	United Kingdom	The ship was abandoned in the Atlantic Ocean. Paragon (United Kingdom) rescued her crew. Gardner & Joseph was on a voyage from Hull, Yorkshire to Saint John, New Brunswick, British North America.
Goodintent	United Kingdom	The ship was wrecked on the Hefton, in the Baltic Sea off Toolse, Russia. She was on a voyage from London to Saint Petersburg, Russia.
Hero	United Kingdom	The ship foundered in the Atlantic Ocean off the coast of Brazil. At least two of her crew survived. She was on a voyage from London to Rio de Janeiro, Brazil.
Heywood	United Kingdom	The ship foundered in the Mediterranean Sea south east of Mallorca, Spain. Her crew survived. She was on a voyage from Greenock, Renfrewshire to Livorno.Grand Duchy of Tuscany.
Newburgh Volunteers	United Kingdom	The ship was wrecked near Dunbar, Lothian, Her crew were rescued. She was on a voyage from Newcastle upon Tyne to Leith, Lothiam.
Ruby	United Kingdom	The schooner was driven ashore and wrecked at Cheswick, Northumberland with the loss of three of her five crew. She was on a voyage from Kiel, Duchy of Holstein to Grangemouth, Stirlingshire.
Ruby	United Kingdom	The schooner was driven ashore and wrecked at Goswick, Northumberland with the loss of three of her five crew.

== 10 October ==
List of shipwrecks: 10 October 1824
Ship	State	Description
Abigail	United States	The ship was wrecked at St. Ubes, Portugal. She was on a voyage from St. Ubes to New York.
Dwarf	United Kingdom	The cutter was wrecked at Kingstown, County Dublin. Her crew were rescued.
Fame	United Kingdom	The ship was driven ashore and wrecked in Ballycastle Bay.
Friendschaft	Rostock	The ship was sighted in the Øresund whilst on a voyage from Rostock to London, United Kingdom. No further trace, presumed foundered with the loss of all hands.
Hermes	United Kingdom	The collier was driven ashore and severely damaged at Bridlington. Her crew were rescued. She was on a voyage from Hull, Yorkshire to South Shields, County Durham. Hermes had been refloated by 25 October and taken in to Bridlington.
Maria Sophia	Prussia	The ship was sighted in the Øresund whilst on a voyage from Stralsund to London, United Kingdom. No further trace, presumed foundered with the loss of all hands.
Mathilde	Prussia	The ship passed through the Skaggerak whilst on a voyage from Pillau to London, United Kingdom. No further trace, presumed foundered in the North Sea with the loss of all hands.
Robert	United Kingdom	The ship was driven ashore at Hornsea, Yorkshire. Her crew were rescued. She was on a voyage from Ipswich, Suffolk to Sunderland, County Durham.
Ophelia	United Kingdom	The ship was driven ashore and severely damaged at Wilsthorpe, Yorkshire. Her crew were rescued. Ophelia had been refloated by 25 October and taken in to Bridlington.
Sally	United Kingdom	The sloop was driven ashore and wrecked at Howth, County Dublin. Her crew were rescued.
Science	United Kingdom	The ship was driven ashore and severely damaged at Wilsthorpe. Her crew were rescued. She was refloated on 6 November and taken in to Bridlington.
Union	United Kingdom	The ship was driven ashore and severely damaged at Bridlington, East Riding of Yorkshire. Her crew were rescued. She had been refloated by 25 October and taken in to Bridlington.
Voyager	United Kingdom	The ship was wrecked on Götaland, Sweden. Her crew were rescued.
Zuster Abedina	Netherlands	The galiot was sighted off Randaberg, Norway whilst on a voyage from Stettin to Schiedam, South Holland. No further trace, presumed foundered with the loss of all hands.

== 11 October ==
List of shipwrecks: 11 October 1824
Ship	State	Description
Acorn	United Kingdom	The collier was driven ashore at Seaton Carew, County Durham.
Active	United Kingdom	The ship was driven ashore at Hartlepool.
Adler	Danzig	The ship was driven ashore at Aldeburgh, Suffolk, United Kingdom. She was on a voyage from Danzig to Hull, Yorkshire, United Kingdom.
Adventure	United Kingdom	The ship was driven ashore at Grimsby, Lincolnshire. She had been refloated by 23 October and taken in to Grimbsy.
Alder	Danzig	The ship was driven ashore between Hornsea and Spurn Point, Yorkshire. She was on a voyage from Danzig to Hull.
Ann	United Kingdom	The ship was driven ashore at Hartlepool, County Durham.
Ann	United Kingdom	The ship was driven ashore at Hull.
Ann	United Kingdom	The full-rigged ship was driven ashore and wrecked at Blyth, Northumberland. Her crew were rescued. She was on a voyage from South Shields, County Durham to New York, United States
Ann	United Kingdom	The ship was driven ashore and wrecked at Cresswell, Northumberland. Her crew were rescued.
Ann's Resolution	United Kingdom	The ship was driven ashore at Seaton Carew.
Arctic	United Kingdom	The collier was driven ashore at Seaton Carew.
Argo	United Kingdom	The ship was driven ashore and wrecked at Scarborough, Yorkshire with the loss of all hands.
Aquilon	United Kingdom	The ship was driven ashore near the mouth of the Tees.
Betsey	United Kingdom	The ship foundered in the North Sea off Hartlepool, County Durham. Her crew were rescued. She was on a voyage from Ipswich, Suffolk to Newcastle upon Tyne, Northumberland.
Blakiston	United Kingdom	The ship was driven ashore at Hartlepool.
Bolina	United Kingdom	The ship was driven ashore at Hartlepool.
Broadwood	United Kingdom	The ship was driven ashore between Sunderland and the mouth of the Tees.
Calypso	(Sweden) Norway	The ship was wrecked on the Lemon Sand, in the North Sea. Her crew survived. She was on a voyage from Drammen to London, United Kingdom.
Confederacy	United Kingdom	The ship was driven ashore and sunk at Seaton Carew.
Diamond	United Kingdom	The ship was driven ashore and wrecked between Hornsea and Spurn Point with the loss of two of her crew.
Don	United Kingdom	The ship was driven ashore and severely damaged at Williamstown, County Galway. Her crew were rescued.
Dwarf	United Kingdom	The ship was driven ashore near Blyth. Her crew were rescued.
Economy	United Kingdom	The ship was driven ashore between Sunderland and the mouth of the Tees.
Edward	United Kingdom	The ship was driven ashore near the mouth of the Tees.
Eliza	United Kingdom	The ship capsized in the River Tyne at Howdon, Northumberland. She was later refloated and found to be severely damaged.
Elizabeth	United Kingdom	The ship was driven ashore and wrecked near Grimsby. She was on a voyage from Hull to Newcastle upon Tyne, Northumberland.
Elizabeth	United Kingdom	The collier was driven ashore at Seaton Carew.
Elizabeth	United Kingdom	The ship was driven ashore and wrecked between Hornsea and Spurn Point. She was on a voyage from Hull to Newcastle upon tyne.
Elizabeth and Sarah	United Kingdom	The ship was driven ashore between Sunderland and the mouth of the Tees.
Enigheden	flag unknown	The ship was driven ashore in the River Tees.
Fame	United Kingdom	The ship was driven ashore near Sunderland.
Fenwick	United Kingdom	The ship was driven ashore between Sunderland and the mouth of the Tees.
Flyde	United Kingdom	The ship was wrecked on the White Bank, in the Irish Sea off Dublin.
Fortitude	United Kingdom	The ship was driven ashore at Whitby, Yorkshire. Her crew were rescued by the Whitby Lifeboat. She had been refloated by 22 October.
Fortuna	Denmark	The galiot was driven ashore and wrecked near Bamburgh Castle, Northumberland with the loss of five of her seven crew. She was on a voyage from Denmark to Newcastle upon Tyne.
Frances and Ann	United Kingdom	The ship was driven ashore near Dundalk, County Louth. Her crew were rescued. She was on a voyage from Liverpool, Lancashire to Strangford, County Antrim.
Friends	United Kingdom	The ship was driven ashore at Scarborough. Her crew were rescued by the Scarborough Lifeboat.
Friends	United Kingdom	The brig was driven ashore at the mouth of the River Tees with the loss of all hands.
Friendship	United Kingdom	The ship was driven ashore at Whitby. Her crew were rescued by the Whitby Lifeboat.
Fyle	United Kingdom	The ship was driven ashore near Dublin. She was on a voyage from Newry, County Down to Chepstow, Monmouthshire.
Galyanta	Norway	The ship was driven ashore near Blyth, Northumberland. She was on a voyage from Mandahl to Newcastle upon Tyne.
Garland	United Kingdom	The ship was driven ashore at Hull. She had been refloated by 22 October.
George and Elizabeth	United Kingdom	The ship was driven ashore in Filey Bay. Her crew were rescued.
Good Design	United Kingdom	The ship was driven ashore near Blyth.
Grantham	United Kingdom	The ship was driven ashore near the mouth of the Tees.
Halcyon	United Kingdom	The ship was driven ashore near Sunderland.
Harmony	flag unknown	The ship was driven ashore near Scarborough. She had been refloated by 28 October and taken in to Scarborough.
Hanbury	United Kingdom	The ship was driven ashore and severely damaged at Robin Hoods Bay, Yorkshire. She was on a voyage from London to South Shields.
Hebe	United Kingdom	The ship was driven ashore and severely damaged at Scarborough. Her crew were rescued by the Scarborough Lifeboat. She had been refloated by 28 October and taken in to Scarborough.
Henry	United Kingdom	The ship was driven ashore at Whitby. Her crew were rescued by the Whitby Lifeboat. She had been refloated by 22 October and taken in to Blyth for repairs.
Henry	United Kingdom	The full-rigged ship was driven ashore and severely damaged at Cresswell. Her crew were rescued.
Henry and Harriet	United Kingdom	The ship was driven ashore at Whitby. She had been refloated by 28 October and taken in to Whitby.
Hero	United Kingdom	The ship foundered in Dublin Bay. She was on a voyage from Waterford to Liverpool.
Hope	United Kingdom	The ship was driven ashore in Filey Bay. Her crew were rescued. Hope was refloated in November and taken in to Scarborough for repairs.
Hope	United Kingdom	The ship was driven ashore between Sunderland and the mouth of the Tees.
Hope	United Kingdom	The ship was driven ashore near Hull.
Hunbury	United Kingdom	The ship was driven ashore at Robin Hoods Bay, Yorkshire. Her crew were rescued.
James	United Kingdom	The ship was driven ashore in the River Tees.
Jane	United Kingdom	The ship was driven ashore at Hartlepool, County Durham.
Jane	United Kingdom	The ship was severely damaged at Dublin. She was on a voyage from Liverpool to Dublin.
Janet	United Kingdom	The smack was driven against the quayside and wrecked at Greenock, Renfrewshire.
Joseph	United Kingdom	The ship was driven ashore at North Berwick, Lothian. Her crew were rescued.
Lark	United Kingdom	The ship was driven ashore at Whitby. Her crew were rescued. She had been refloated by 22 October.
Leveret	United Kingdom	The ship was driven ashore in the River Tees.
Liberty	United Kingdom	The ship was driven ashore at Whitby. Her crew were rescued by the Whitby Lifeboat.
Louisa	United Kingdom	The ship was driven ashore in Firestone Bay and severely damaged. She was refloated the next day.
Louise	Grand Duchy of Oldenburg	The ship was driven ashore and sank near Scarborough. She was on a voyage from Husum, Kingdom of Hanover to Grimsby. Louise had been refloated by 28 October and taken in to Scarborough.
Margaret	United Kingdom	The ship foundered in the Irish Sea off Dublin with the loss of all hands.
Marquis Wellington	United Kingdom	The ship was driven ashore and wrecked at Spurn Point, Yorkshire. She was on a voyage from Arkhangelsk, Russia to London.
Mars	United Kingdom	The collier was driven ashore at Seaton Carew.
Martha	United Kingdom	The ship was driven ashore at Hartlepool.
Mary	United Kingdom	The Newcastle-registered ship was driven ashore between Hartlepool and the mouth of the Tees.
Mary	United Kingdom	The South Shields-registered ship was driven ashore between Hartlepool and the mouth of the Tees.
Mary	United Kingdom	The Great Yarmouth-registered full-rigged ship was driven ashore and wrecked near Blyth. Her crew were rescued.
Mary Frances	United Kingdom	The ship was driven ashore at Williamstown. Her crew were rescued.
Mercury	United Kingdom	The brig was driven ashore and wrecked at Scarborough. Her crew survived. She was on a voyage from Honfleur, Calvados, France to Scarborough.
Nancy	United Kingdom	The brig was driven ashore near Cleethorpes, Lincolnshire.
Nelson	United Kingdom	The ship was driven ashore near Blyth.
Neptune	United Kingdom	The ship ran aground on the South Knowle, in the North Sea. Her fourteen crew were rescued by the Redcar Lifeboat. She was subsequently driven ashore in the River Tees and wrecked. Neptune was on a voyage from Saint Petersburg, Russia to Hull.
Neptune	United Kingdom	The ship was driven ashore in the River Tees. She was on a voyage from Saint Petersburg to London.
Nereus	United Kingdom	The ship was driven ashore at Hartlepool.
New Concord	United Kingdom	The ship was driven ashore between Sunderland and the mouth of the Tees.
New Shoreham	United Kingdom	The ship was driven ashore on Sunk Island, Yorkshire. Her crew were rescued. She was on a voyage from Jersey, Channel Islands to Leith.
Norfolk	United Kingdom	The ship was driven ashore and severely damaged at Robin Hoods Bay. Her crew were rescued.
Ophelia	United Kingdom	The ship was driven ashore near Sunderland.
Petersburgh	United Kingdom	The ship was driven ashore between Hornsea and Spurn Point. She was on a voyage from Colchester, Essex to Sunderland.
Prospect	United Kingdom	The ship was driven ashore at Scarborough. Her crew were rescued by the Scarborough Lifeboat. She had been refloated by 28 October and taken in to Scarborough.
Providence	United Kingdom	The schooner was driven ashore near Blyth. She was on a voyage from Hull to Leith, Lothian.
Resolution	(Sweden) Norway	The brig was severely damaged at Porthleven, Cornwall, United Kingdom. She was later taken in to Penzance, Cornwall for repairs.
Rambler	United Kingdom	The ship was driven ashore between Sunderland and the mouth of the Tees.
Ridley	United Kingdom	The ship was driven ashore at Hartlepool.
Rigby	United Kingdom	The full-rigged ship was driven ashore at Cresswell. Her crew were rescued.
Robert Burns	United States	The ship was driven ashore and wrecked near Alnmouth, Northumberland.
Sally	United Kingdom	The ship was driven ashore at Whitby. She had been refloated by 28 October and take in to Whitby.
Sarah	United Kingdom	The ship was driven ashore at Dún Laoghaire, County Dublin.
Squirrel	United Kingdom	The ship foundered in the North Sea off Whitby.
Suffolk	United Kingdom	The collier was driven ashore at Seaton Carew.
Sophia	Rostock	The ship was wrecked on the North Gar, in the North Sea off the mouth of the Tees, with the loss of her captain. The survivors were rescued by the Seaton Carew Lifeboat.
Tay	United Kingdom	The smack was driven ashore and sank at Scarborough. Her crew were rescued. She was on a voyage from Dundee, Forfarshire to London.
Thornton	United Kingdom	The collier was driven ashore at Seaton Carew.
Thompson	United Kingdom	The ship was driven ashore at Robin Hood's Bay.
Vie Erndte	Sweden	The sloop was driven ashore and wrecked at Hartley, Northumberland, United Kingdom. Her crew were rescued. She was on a voyage from Stralsund to Newcastle upon Tyne, Northumberland.
Wealands	United Kingdom	The ship was driven ashore at Seaton Carew.
Wharfe	United Kingdom	The brig was driven ashore at Hartlepool. All on board were rescued.
William	United Kingdom	The ship was driven ashore at Robin Hoods Bay. Her crew were rescued.
William	United Kingdom	The ship was driven ashore between Hartlepool and the mouth of the Tees.
William	United Kingdom	The ship was driven ashore between Hornsea and Spurn Point. She was on a voyage from Portsmouth, Hampshire to Sunderland, County Durham.
Wilson	United Kingdom	The collier was driven ashore at Seaton Carew.
Yare	United Kingdom	The ship was driven ashore at Creswell.

== 12 October ==
List of shipwrecks: 12 October 1824
Ship	State	Description
Albion	United Kingdom	The ship was driven ashore near Grimsby, Lincolnshire. She was on a voyage from London to Sunderland, County Durham.
Amelia Johanna	Netherlands	The ship was driven ashore and wrecked near Filey, Yorkshire, United Kingdom. She was on a voyage from Antwerp to Leith, Lothian, United Kingdom.
Anatolia	United Kingdom	The ship was driven ashore near Grimsby. She was on a voyage from London to South Shields, County Durham. Anatolia had been refloated by 23 October and taken in to Grimsby.
Ann	United Kingdom	The ship was driven ashore near Grimsby. She had been refloated by 24 October and taken in to Grimsby.
Anna Maria	Kingdom of Hanover	The ship was driven ashore and wrecked at Cayton, Yorkshire, United Kingdom with the loss of all hands.
Arvales	United Kingdom	The ship was driven ashore at Grimsby. She had been refloated by 23 October and sailed for Sunderland, County Durham.
Census	United Kingdom	The ship was driven ashore near Grimsby. She was on a voyage from London to Sunderland.
Chichester	United Kingdom	The sloop foundered in The Wash off Hunstanton, Norfolk with the loss of five of the seven people on board. She was on a voyage from Ipswich, Suffolk to Boston, Lincolnshire.
Delight	United Kingdom	The ship was driven ashore and wrecked near Waxholme, Yorkshire. She was on a voyage from Arkhangelsk, Russia to London or Portsmouth, Hampshire.
Diligence	United Kingdom	The sloop was driven ashore and wrecked at Sizewell, Suffolk. She was on a voyage from Saint Petersburg, Russia to London.
Equity	United Kingdom	The ship was driven ashore at Cromer, Norfolk. Her crew were rescued by the Cromer Lifeboat. She was on a voyage from Cardiff, Glamorgan to Newcastle upon Tyne, Northumberland.
Frederika Catharina	Duchy of Holstein	The ship departed from Husum for Grimsby. No further trace, presumed foundered in the North Sea with the loss of all hands
Friends	United Kingdom	The ship was driven ashore near Grimsby.
Happy Return	United Kingdom	The ship was driven ashore near Grimsby. She was on a voyage from London to Sunderland. Happy Return had been refloated by 23 October and taken in to Grimsby.
Harmony	(Sweden) Norway	The ship sprang a leak in the North Sea 18 leagues (54 nautical miles (100 km)) off Texel, North Holland, Netherlands. Her crew were rescued by the brig Two Brothers (United States) and a galiot. Harmony was on a voyage from Arendal to Amsterdam, North Holland.
Hebina	Bremen	The ship was abandoned in the North Sea (54°N 4°E). All on board were rescued by George (United Kingdom). Hebina was on a voyage from St. Thomas, Virgin Islands to Bremen.
Hercules	United Kingdom	The ship was lost near Ny-Hellesund, Norway. Her crew were rescued. She was on a voyage from Hull to Stettin.
Hoffnung	Kingdom of Hanover	The ship was driven ashore near Brancaster, Norfolk. Her crew were rescued. She was on a voyage from Husum to Grimsby.
Horatia	United Kingdom	The ship was driven ashore near Grimsby. She had been refloated by 24 October and taken in to Grimsby.
Isabella and Euphemia	United Kingdom	The ship was driven ashore near Grimsby. She was on a voyage from Stralsund, Sweden to London.
Johanna	United Kingdom	The ship was driven ashore near Grimsby. She was on a voyage from Hull to Newcastle upon Tyne. Johanna had been refloated by 23 October and sailed for Newcastle upon Tyne.
John and Mary	United Kingdom	The sloop was driven ashore at North Somercotes. Lincolnshire. She was on a voyage from Wisbech, Cambridgeshire to Leeds, Yorkshire.
Lady Williamson	United Kingdom	The ship was driven ashore near Grimsby. She was on a voyage from Hull to Rotterdam, South Holland, Netherlands. Lady Williamson had been refloated by 24 October and taken in to Grimsby.
Lord Wellington	Danzig	The ship was driven ashore at Theddlethorpe, Lincolnshire. Her crew were rescued. She was on a voyage from Danzig to London.
Margaret	United Kingdom	The ship was driven ashore near Grimsby. She was on a voyage from London to Sunderland, County Durham.
Maria	United Kingdom	The ship sprang a leak and foundered in St Brides Bay. Her crew were rescued.
Maria and Martha	Hamburg	The ship was driven ashore near Grimsby. She had been refloated by 24 October and taken in to Grimsby.
Nancy	United Kingdom	The ship was driven ashore near Grimsby. She was on a voyage from Rye, Sussex to Whitby.
Peggy and Ellen	United Kingdom	The ship was wrecked north of the Isle of Skye. She was on a voyage from Trondheim, Norway to Belfast, County Antrim.
Robert Burns	United States	The ship was driven ashore and wrecked near Blyth, Northumberland. Her crew were rescued by rocket apparatus. She was on a voyage from Hull to New York.
South Esk	United Kingdom	The ship was driven ashore at Brest, Finistère, France.
Telus	United Kingdom	The ship was lost near Ny-Hellesund. Her crew were rescued. She was on a voyage from Memel, Prussia to Hull.
Thames	United Kingdom	The ship was driven ashore at Grimsby.
Thomas	United Kingdom	The ship was driven ashore near Grimsby.
Vine	United Kingdom	The ship was driven ashore near Grimsby. She had been refloated by 22 October.
Visitor	United Kingdom	The collier was driven ashore near Waxholme. She was on a voyage from London to South Shields or Sunderland.
Vrow Swartzje	Netherlands	The ship was driven ashore near Grimsby. She was on a voyage from Amsterdam, North Holland to Newcastle upon Tyne.
Wenskappen	(Sweden) Norway	The ship was wrecked near Christiansand, Norway. She was on a voyage from Gothenburg to Leith, Lothian, United Kingdom.
William Penn	United Kingdom	The ship was driven ashore near Grimsby. She was on a voyage from Arkhangelsk to London. William Penn had been refloated by 24 October and taken in to Grimsby.

== 14 October ==
List of shipwrecks: 14 October 1824
Ship	State	Description
Allison	United Kingdom	The ship was driven ashore between Sunderland, County Durham and the mouth of the Tees.
Armatha	United Kingdom	The ship was driven ashore between Hartlepool, County Durham and the mouth of the Tees.
Arno	United Kingdom	The ship was driven ashore between Sunderland and the mouth of the Tees.
Aurora	United Kingdom	The collier was driven ashore and wrecked near Sunderland, County Durham with the loss of nine of her thirteen crew.
Bellona	United Kingdom	The ship was driven ashore between Sunderland and the mouth of the Tees.
Cornwallis	United Kingdom	The collier was driven ashore and wrecked near Redcar, Yorkshire. Her crew were rescued.
Diana	United Kingdom	The collier was driven ashore at Seaton Carew.
Diana	United Kingdom	The ship foundered in the North Sea 16 nautical miles (30 km) off the mouth of the Humber. Her four crew were rescued by John (United Kingdom). She was on a voyage from Southwold, Suffolk to South Shields.
Diligence	United Kingdom	The collier was driven ashore at Seaton Carew.
Dolphin	United Kingdom	The collier was driven ashore at Seaton Carew.
Eliza	United Kingdom	The collier was driven ashore and wrecked at Seaton Carew. Her crew were rescued.
Elizabeth	United Kingdom	The ship was driven ashore between Hartlepool and the mouth of the Tees.
Endeavour	United Kingdom	The ship was driven ashore between Sunderland and the mouth of the Tees.
Fame	United Kingdom	The ship was driven ashore between Sunderland and the mouth of the Tees.
Friendship	United Kingdom	The ship was wrecked on the Herd Sand, in the North Sea off South Shields, County Durham. Her crew were rescued.
Gleaner	United Kingdom	The ship was driven ashore between Sunderland and the mouth of the Tees.
Gute Hoffnung	Grand Duchy of Oldenburg	The ship was lost near Texel with the loss of all hands. She was on a voyage from Carolinensiel to London.
Halcyon	United Kingdom	The ship was driven ashore between Sunderland and the mouth of the Tees.
Hannah	United Kingdom	The ship was driven ashore and wrecked between Sunderland and the mouth of the Tees.
Hector	United Kingdom	The ship was damaged on the Herd Sand. Her crew were rescued by the South Shields Lifeboat. She was on a voyage from Arkhangelsk, Russia to London. Hector was refloated on 21 October and taken in to South Shields for repairs.
Henrietta	Prussia	The ship was driven ashore and wrecked at Danzig. She was on a voyage from Königsburg to London.
Henry's Harriett	United Kingdom	The collier was driven ashore and wrecked near Staithes, Yorkshire.
Hope	United Kingdom	The ship was driven ashore and wrecked at Wexford. She was on a voyage from Youghall, County Cork to Liverpool, Lancashire.
Hunter	United Kingdom	The collier was driven ashore and wrecked near Sunderland. Her crew were rescued.
Jane	United Kingdom	The ship was driven ashore between Sunderland and the mouth of the Tees.
Jasper	United Kingdom	The ship was driven ashore between Sunderland and the mouth of the Tees.
Jenny	United Kingdom	The collier was driven ashore and wrecked near Easington, County Durham with the loss of four of her crew.
Junius	United Kingdom	The collier foundered in the North Sea.
Lipton	United Kingdom	The ship was driven ashore between Sunderland and the mouth of the Tees.
Manchester	United Kingdom	The ship was driven ashore between Sunderland and the mouth of the Tees.
Margaret	United Kingdom	The ship was driven ashore near Wicklow. She was on a voyage from Liverpool to Limekilns, Fife.
Marmion	United Kingdom	The ship was driven ashore between Sunderland and the mouth of the Tees.
Marquis Huntly	United Kingdom	The ship was driven ashore between Sunderland and the mouth of the Tees.
Ocean	United Kingdom	The ship was driven ashore between Sunderland and the mouth of the Tees.
Paragon	United Kingdom	The collier was driven ashore and wrecked near Easington. Her crew were rescued.
Russell	United Kingdom	The ship was driven ashore between Sunderland and the mouth of the Tees.
South Esk	United Kingdom	The ship was driven ashore at Brest, Finistère, France. She was on a voyage from Liverpool, Lancashire to Messina, Sicily.
Three Sisters	United Kingdom	The ship was driven ashore near Scheveningen, South Holland, Netherlands with the loss of one life. She was on a voyage from London to Rotterdam, South Holland.
Union	United Kingdom	The sloop foundered in the Irish Sea off Cemaes Head, Anglesey. Her crew were rescued.
William and Mary	United Kingdom	The collier was driven ashore and wrecked near Easington. Her crew were rescued.
Williams	United Kingdom	The ship was driven ashore between Sunderland and the mouth of the Tees.

== 15 October ==
List of shipwrecks: 15 October 1824
Ship	State	Description
Alida	United Kingdom	The ship was abandoned in the North Sea. She was on a voyage from Amsterdam, North Holland, Netherlands to King's Lynn, Norfolk. Alida subsequently came ashore at Bergen-op-Zoom, North Brabant, Netherlands and was wrecked.
Aurora	United Kingdom of the Netherlands	The ship ran aground off Huisduinen, North Holland. She was on a voyage from Narva, Russia to Amsterdam, North Holland.
Goede Hoop	Netherlands	The ship was lost in the Rottum Islands, Groningen. Her crew were rescued. She was on a voyage from Rotterdam, South Holland to Leith, Lothian, United Kingdom.
Haabets Anker	Netherlands	The ship was driven ashore on Vlieland, Friesland. She was on a voyage from Drammen, Norway to Amsterdam.
Jonge Antje	Grand Duchy of Oldenburg	The ship was driven ashore on Vlieland. She was on a voyage from London to Emden.
Vrede	Netherlands	The ship ran aground off Huisduinen. She was on a voyage from Narva to Amsterdam.

== 16 October ==
List of shipwrecks: 16 October 1824
Ship	State	Description
Aaron	(Russian Empire) Grand Duchy of Finland	The ship was driven ashore near Helsingør, Denmark. She was on a voyage from Pori to London, United Kingdom.
Alborren	Netherlands	The ship was wrecked on the coast of Zeeland. She was on a voyage from Havana, Cuba to Rotterdam, South Holland.
Elizabeth	United Kingdom	The ship foundered in the Bay of Biscay. Her crew were rescued. She was on a voyage from Plymouth, Devon to Lisbon, Portugal.
Maria	United Kingdom	The ship was abandoned in the Atlantic Ocean having already lost five crew and four passengers. Survivors were rescued by Portaferry (United Kingdom). Maria was on a voyage from Quebec City, Lower Canada, British North America to Milford Haven, Pembrokeshire.

== 17 October ==
List of shipwrecks: 17 October 1824
Ship	State	Description
Ebenezer	United Kingdom	The ship was driven ashore and wrecked at Wells-next-the-Sea, Norfolk. She was on a voyage from London to Spalding, Lincolnshire.
Edward	United Kingdom	The ship was beached on Anholt, Denmark. Her crew were rescued. She was on a voyage from Grangemouth, Stirlingshire to Stettin.
Hope	United Kingdom	The ship was driven ashore at Memel, Prussia. She was on a voyage from Chepstow, Monmouthshire to Memel. Hope was refloated on 8 July 1825 and taken in to Memel, where she was condemned.
Lagan	Sweden	The schooner was beached and wrecked at St. Ubes, Portugal.

== 18 October ==
List of shipwrecks: 18 October 1824
Ship	State	Description
Josephine	United Kingdom	The ship was wrecked on the Cross Sand, in the North Sea off the coast of Norfolk. Her crew survived. She was on a voyage from Memel, Prussia to Plymouth, Devon.
Monkwearmouth	United Kingdom	The ship was wrecked in the Farne Islands, Northumberland. Her crew were rescued. She was on a voyage from Aberdeen to Sunderland, County Durham.
Narcissus	United Kingdom	The ship was driven ashore near Grado, Austrian Empire. She was on a voyage from Bahia, Brazil to Trieste. Narcissus was later refloated; She arrived at Trieste on 23 October.
Vigilant	United Kingdom	The ship was lost off "Wyburg". Her crew were rescued. She was on a voyage from Liverpool, Lancashire to "Wyburg".

== 19 October ==
List of shipwrecks: 19 October 1824
Ship	State	Description
Armatha	United Kingdom	The ship was driven ashore between Sunderland and the mouth of the River Tees, County Durham.
Charles	United Kingdom	The ship was driven ashore and severely damaged north of Maryport, Cumberland. She had been refloated by 25 October and taken in to Maryport.
Diana	United Kingdom	The ship foundered in the North Sea 16 nautical miles (30 km) off the mouth of the Humber. Her crew were rescued.
Eclair	France	The ship was driven ashore on the Île de Ré. She was on a voyage from Bordeaux, Gironde to Charleston, South Carolina, United States.
Elodie	France	The ship was driven ashore near Marans, Charente-Maritime. She was on a voyage from Senegal to Bordeaux.
Fortune	United Kingdom	The ship was lost south of "Bevenbergen", Jutland. Her crew were rescued. She was on a voyage from Leith, Lothian to Memel, Prussia.
Friendschap	Grand Duchy of Oldenburg	The ship was driven ashore on Heligoland.
Hannah	United Kingdom	The ship was driven ashore and wrecked between Sunderland and the mouth of the River Tees.
Marmion	United Kingdom	The ship was driven ashore between Sunderland and the mouth of the River Tees.
Paulina	(United Kingdom of Great Britain and Ireland) Gibraltar	The ship was lost near the mouth of the Palmones, Spain. She was on a voyage from Gergenti, Sicily to Gibraltar.
Sally	United Kingdom	The ship was driven ashore at Kettleness, Yorkshire.
Triton	United Kingdom	The ship capsized in the River Thames. She was on a voyage from London to South Shields, County Durham.
Vine	United Kingdom	The schooner was driven ashore near Allanby, Cumberland. She had been refloated by 25 October and taken in to Maryport.
Vriendschap	Netherlands	The ship was driven ashore on Heligoland.

== 20 October ==
List of shipwrecks: 20 October 1824
Ship	State	Description
Eugene	France	The ship was driven ashore between the River Guadiara and the Spanish Lines. She was on a voyage from Marseille, Bouches-du-Rhône to Rouen, Seine-Inférieure.
Fingal	United Kingdom	The ship was run down and sunk in the North Sea by the brig Velatura (United Kingdom). She was on a voyage from Cardiff, Glamorgan to Newcastle upon Tyne, Northumberland.
Henry	France	The ship was driven ashore between the River Guadiara and the Spanish Lines. She was on a voyage from Marseille to Nantes, Loire-Inférieure.
Louise Auguste	(Sweden) Norway	The ship was wrecked on Ameland, Friesland, Netherlands with the loss of her captain. She was on a voyage from Christiansand to Amsterdam, North Holland, Netherlands.
Planeten	Sweden	The ship was wrecked on Ameland, Friesland. She was on a voyage from Stockholm to Dunkirk, Nord, France.
Twee Gezwagers	(Denmark) Duchy of Schleswig	The ship was driven ashore on Terschelling, Friesland. She was on a voyage from Tetenbüll to London, United Kingdom.
Vrow Antje	(Denmark) Duchy of Schleswig	The ship was wrecked in the Vlie with the loss of all hands. She was on a voyage from Husum to London.
Vrow Margaretta	Netherlands	The ship was wrecked in the Vlie. She was on a voyage from Christiansand to Rotterdam.
Watchful	United Kingdom	The ship was driven ashore between the River Guadiara and the Spanish Lines. She was on a voyage from Denia, Spain to Bristol, Gloucestershire.
William	United Kingdom	The ship was lost in the Gulf of St Lawrence. Her crew were rescued. she was on a voyage from Quebec City, Lower Canada, British North America to Ross, County Wexford.
William and John	United States	The ship was lost in the Vlie with the loss of all but one of her crew. She was on a voyage from New York to Amsterdam.

== 21 October ==
List of shipwrecks: 21 October 1824
Ship	State	Description
Laura Ann	United Kingdom	The ship was captured off the coast of Cuba by pirates, who murdered all but one of her crew and set the vessel afire.
Prince of Brazil	United Kingdom	The ship was driven ashore at Memel, Prussia. She was refloated on 30 October and taken in to Memel.
Tartar	United Kingdom	The ship was driven ashore and wrecked at Memel. Her crew were rescued.

== 22 October ==
List of shipwrecks: 22 October 1824
Ship	State	Description
Anna and Louisa	United Kingdom	The sloop sank in Lough Swilly. She was on a voyage from Cardiff, Glamorgan to Liverpool, Lancashire.
Catharine	United Kingdom	The ship departed from Palermo, Sicily for London. No further trace, presumed foundered with the loss of all hands.
Jane	United Kingdom	The sloop sank in Lough Swilly. She was on a voyage from Newport, Monmouthshire to Liverpool.
Zeelust	Danzig	The ship was wrecked on the Île de Ré, Charente-Maritime, France. She was on a voyage from Danzig to Bordeaux, Gironde, France.

== 24 October ==
List of shipwrecks: 24 October 1824
Ship	State	Description
Acorn	United Kingdom	The schooner was run down and sunk in the English Channel 8 nautical miles (15 km) off Fairlight, Sussex by Killingbeck (United Kingdom). Her crew were rescued. She was on a voyage from Shoreham-by-Sea, Sussex to Sunderland, County Durham.

== 25 October ==
List of shipwrecks: 25 October 1824
Ship	State	Description
Drie Vrienden	Netherlands	The ship departed from Kronstadt, Russia for Amsterdam, North Holland. No further trace, presumed foundered with the loss of all hands.
Tamerlane	United Kingdom	The ship was driven ashore and damaged at Liverpool, Lancashire. She was on a voyage from Saint John, New Brunswick, British North America to Liverpool. Tamerlane was refloated on 7 November and taken in to Liverpool.
Wakefield	United Kingdom	The ship was driven ashore at Hoylake, Lancashire. She was on a voyage from Porto, Portugal to Liverpool. Wakefield was later refloated and taken in to Liverpool.
Zephyr	Spain	The ship was driven ashore at Liverpool. Her crew were rescued. She was on a voyage from Málaga to Liverpool. Zephyr was refloated on 4 November and taken in to Liverpool.

== 26 October ==
List of shipwrecks: 26 October 1824
Ship	State	Description
Briton	United Kingdom	The ship was driven ashore in the River Dee. She was on a voyage from Chester, Cheshire to London. Briton was later refloated and put back to Chester for repairs.
Fox	United Kingdom	The flat foundered in the River Mersey with the loss of her three crew.
Lively	United Kingdom	The ship was driven ashore at Red Wharf Bay, Anglesey. She was on a voyage from Drogheda, County Louth to Preston, Lancashire. Lively was later refloated.
Ocean	United Kingdom	The ship was driven ashore in the River Dee. She was on a voyage from Chester to London. Ocean was later refloated and put back to Chester for repairs.
Rose	United Kingdom	The sloop sank at Liverpool, Lancashire. Her crew were rescued.

== 27 October ==
List of shipwrecks: 27 October 1824
Ship	State	Description
Catherina Hendrika	Denmark	The ship was in collision with Eliza (United Kingdom) in the Baltic Sea off Naissaar, Russia and was abandoned. Her crew were rescued by Eliza.
Furst Blucher	Prussia	The galiot departed from Gravesend, Kent, United Kingdom for Lübeck and Rostock. No further trace, presumed foundered with the loss of all hands.

== 28 October ==
List of shipwrecks: 28 October 1824
Ship	State	Description
Diana	Rostock	The ship was sighted in the Øresund whilst on a voyage from Rostock to London, United Kingdom, No further trace, presumed foundered with the loss of all hands.
Mercator	United Kingdom	The ship ran aground on the Holme Sand, in the North Sea off the coast of Yorkshire. She was later refloated and taken in to Hull, Yorkshire.
USS Wildcat	United States Navy	The schooner sank in a gale with all hands, Apx. 31, between Cuba and Thompson's Island, West Indies.

== 29 October ==
List of shipwrecks: 29 October 1824
Ship	State	Description
Catarina Hendrika	Rostock	The ship was driven ashore near Helsinki, Grand Duchy of Finland and was abandoned by her crew. She was on a voyage from Saint Petersburg, Russia to Rostock.
Emerald	United Kingdom	The ship was wrecked on the North Bank, in Liverpool Bay. Her crew were rescued. She was on a voyage from Liverpool, Lancashire to Belfast, County Antrim.

== 30 October ==
List of shipwrecks: 30 October 1824
Ship	State	Description
Ann	United Kingdom	The ship was wrecked near Hartland Quay, Devon with the loss of all hands. She was on a voyage from Málaga, Spain to Bristol, Gloucestershire.
George	United Kingdom	The ship was driven ashore at Mockbeggar, Cheshire. She was on a voyage from Saint John, New Brunswick, British North America to Liverpool, Lancashire.
Grace	United Kingdom	The ship was driven onto the Levan Sands. She was on a voyage from Waterford to Preston, Lancashire.
Nelson	United Kingdom	The Thames barge capsized in a squall at The Nore. Her crew were rescued. She was on a voyage from Maldon, Essex to London.

== 31 October ==
List of shipwrecks: 31 October 1824
Ship	State	Description
Susannah Maria	Netherlands	The ship was lost neat Texel, North Holland with the loss of all but four of her crew. She was on a voyage from Surinam to Amsterdam, North Holland.

== Unknown date ==
List of shipwrecks: Unknown date 1824
Ship	State	Description
Ann and Mary	United Kingdom	The ship departed from Hamburg for Hull, Yorkshire. No further trace, presumed foundered in the North Sea with the loss of all hands.
Ceres	Sweden	The ship ran aground on Sarn Badrig, in Cardigan Bay and foundered with the loss of all hands. She was on a voyage from Liverpool, Lancashire, United Kingdom to Helsingør, Denmark.
Christoffe Jacobus	Kingdom of Hanover	The ship was driven ashore on Eierland, North Holland, United Kingdom of the Netherlands. She was on a voyage from Emden to Marseille, Bouches-du-Rhône, France.
Crown	United Kingdom	The brig was wrecked on the Goodwin Sands, Kent in late October. Survivors were rescued by the lugger Sparrow (United Kingdom).
Dorothea	Prussia	The ship departed from Kiel for London, United Kingdom in early October. No further trace, presumed foundered with the loss of all hands.
Dublin	United Kingdom	The ship departed from Milford Haven, Pembrokeshire to Amlwch, Anglesey in mid-October. No further trace, presumed foundered in the Irish Sea with the loss of all hands.
Emelie Johanna	France	The ship was driven ashore on Eierland. She was on a voyage from Fredrikstad, Norway to Caen, Calvados.
Fortune	United Kingdom	The ship was driven ashore and wrecked near "Lemwig", Jutland. Her crew were rescued. She was on a voyage from Leith, Lothian to Memel, Prussia.
Hercules	United Kingdom	The ship was wrecked at Miramichi before 25 October.
Herman	Sweden	The galiot was wrecked at Cap Couronne, Bouches-du-Rhône, France. Her crew were rescued. She was on a voyage from Palma de Mallorca to Alicante, Spain and Marseille, Bouches-du-Rhône.
Janet	United Kingdom	The ship was lost at Miramichi before 6 October.
Johannes	Hamburg	The ship departed from Hamburg for Stockton-on-Tees, Yorkshire. No further trace, presumed foundered in the North Sea with the loss of all hands.
King David	Netherlands	The galiot was abandoned in the North Sea on or before 13 October.
Lusitania	United Kingdom	The ship was driven ashore at Domesnes, Norway. She was on a voyage from London to Riga, Russia. Lusitania was later refloated and proceeded to Riga.
Maine	United States	The ship was driven ashore at St Mary's, in the West Indies, in mid-October.
Maria Christina	Sweden	The ship was driven ashore west of Estepona, Spain. She was on a voyage from Hyères, Var, France to Stockholm.
Mary	United Kingdom	The ship was driven ashore on the coast of County Dublin. She was on a voyage from Liverpool, Lancashire to Dublin. Mary was refloated on 19 October and taken in to Dublin.
Mercurius	(Sweden) Norway	The ship was wrecked on Vlieland, Friesland, Netherlands. She was on a voyage from Sandefjord to La Rochelle, Charente-Maritime. France.
Plain Dealings	United Kingdom	The ship was driven ashore and wrecked at Leven Sands, Penmaenmawr, Caernarfonshire with the loss of all hands.
Robert	United Kingdom	The ship was wrecked on Prince Edward Island, British North America before 25 October. Her crew were rescued. She was on a voyage from Glasgow, Renfrewshire to Miramichi.
Sarah	United Kingdom	The brig was wrecked near St. Johns, Florida Territory with the loss of at least two of her crew.
Vrow Fenne	Netherlands	The ship was driven ashore on the south coast of Texel, North Holland. She was on a voyage from Livorno, Grand Duchy of Tuscany to Amsterdam, North Holland.
