= Hired armed lugger Daphne =

The hired armed lugger Daphne served the Royal Navy from 2 November 1794 to 19 December 1796. She was armed with twenty-two 4-pounder guns and was of 1606/94 tons burthen (bm)

== Naval career ==
Daphne apparently served at Jersey together with Aristocrat and Royalist in a small squadron under the command of Captain Philippe d'Auvergne, in the 16-gun Firm-class floating battery HMS Bravo. Daphne's commander was a Lieutenant Robert Pearson. She was employed maintaining communications with French Royalists in Normandy. On 16 March 1795, she was driven ashore at Weymouth, Dorset and was severely damaged.

== Possible origins ==
Daphne, of 160 tons (bm), was launched in 1787 at Poole, appeared in Lloyd's Register in 1793, but was not listed either in 1792 or in 1794. Her master was J. Banfield, her owner St Barbe & Co., and her trade London–Smyrna.

Earlier, a lugger Daphne had received two letters of marque. The first, dated 30 July 1793, gave the name of her master as Patrick Henvey. It described her as being of 160 tons (bm), with a crew of 60 men. She was armed with eighteen 3-, 4-, and 6-pounder guns, and 10 swivel guns. The second letter, dated 13 November 1793, gave the name of her master as Peter Le Lacheur; the change in masters is the most likely cause of the issuance of a new letter.

== Citations and references ==
Citations

References

- Marshall, John (1835). "Higgs, William Henry" . Royal Naval Biography. Vol. 4, part 2. London: Longman and Company. pp. 61–63.
- Winfield, Rif (2008). British Warships in the Age of Sail 1793–1817: Design, Construction, Careers and Fates. Seaforth. ISBN 978-1861762467.
