= HM galley Alarm (1777) =

HM galley Alarm, of eight guns, was the mercantile Mountfield (launched in 1776) that the Royal Navy purchased on 4 June 1777. (Note: Winfield refers to Mountfield as an East Indiaman, however there is no record of an East Indiaman by that name.) She may have been a galley, or have been converted to one after purchase. Her commander scuttled in July 1778 to avoid her capture.

Lieutenant Philippe d'Auvergne commissioned her in October at Rhode Island.

On 29 June 1778, during a larger operation against American forces, Alarm landed a party of marines at Fogland Ferry that destroyed the guardhouse there. Alarm's foray was a diversion, intended to draw American attention to the Seconnet shore.

On 30 December Alarm burnt and destroyed in the Sekannet Passage a vessel from Providence, Rhode Island.

In 1778 France and Spain signed a treaty of alliance with the American colonies. When French frigates entered Rhode Island, Lieutenant d'Auvergne carried out his written orders and scuttled Alarm on 30 July 1778. She was anchored in the Sakonnet Passage near the sloop HMS Kingfisher and HM galley Spitfire. As the French approached d'Auvergne ran her ashore and set fire to her.

The court martial of d'Auvergne for the loss of his vessel is reported as being aboard HMS Royal Oak on 28 September 1778. The court martial acquitted d'Auvergne; the British had been forced to scuttle ten vessels in all, including Flora.
