= Holderness (1789 ship) =

History

Great Britain
- Name: Holderness
- Namesake: Holderness
- Owner: 1789: Green & Co.; 1796-7:Various; 1798:Bruce & Co.; 1802:Dobkin & Co.
- Builder: Selby, Yorkshire
- Launched: 18 April 1789
- Fate: Captured and burnt 2 August 1806

General characteristics
- Tons burthen: 353, or 35373/94, or 361 (bm)
- Length: 105 ft 5 in (32.1 m) (overall); 84 ft 4 in (25.7 m) (keel)
- Beam: 28 ft 1 in (8.6 m)
- Depth of hold: 13 ft 8 in (4.2 m)
- Propulsion: Sail
- Complement: 30
- Armament: 8 × 12&4-pounder guns

Holderness was launched in 1789, at Selby, Yorkshire. She made one voyage for the British East India Company (EIC) in 1794–95. She then became a West Indiaman until 1801, when a new owner used her as a Greenland whaler. In 1806, two French warships captured and burnt her.

== Career ==
Lloyd's Register for 1790 lists Holderness with W. Wray, master, P. Green, owner, and trade Hull—St Petersburg.

On 14 September 1792, Lloyd's List reported that Holderness, Wray, master, had run ashore on the Holm Sand while sailing from New York to Hull. She was gotten off with little damage.

EIC voyage (1794–1795): The EIC had Hill repair and measure Holderness prior to chartering her for one voyage to India. Captain George Wright acquired a letter of marque on 14 May 1794. He then sailed from the Downs on 11 June, bound for Bengal. Holderness arrived at Calcutta on 23 November. She left Bengal on 18 February 1795, was at Madras on 3 March, and reached Saint Helena on 24 May. She reached Shannon and arrived at the Downs on 15 October.

Greenland whaler

Year	Master	Owner	Trade	Tuns whale oil
1797	G.Wright; G.Brown	Green & Co. W.Hellen	London–Bengal; London–Grenada	
1798	Brown; J. Cummings	Lushington; Bruce & Co.	London–Grenada	
1801	A.Dixon	Bruce & Co.	London–Grenada	
1802	A.Dixon; J.Page	Bruce & Co. Dobkin & Co.	London–Grenada; Hull–Greenland	135
1803	J.Page	Dobkin & Co.	Hull–Greenland	35

On 4 March 1803, Lloyd's List (LL) reported that Holderness and Gardiner and Joseph had been on their way to Davis Strait when they had had to put back to Hull having lost anchors and cables, and having sustained other damage.

Year	Master	Owner	Trade	Tuns whale oil
1804	J.Page	Dobkin & Co.	Hull–Davis Strait	140
1805	J.Page	Dobkin & Co.	Hull–Davis Strait	182
1806	J.Page; W. Swan	Dobkin & Co.	Hull–Davis Strait	0

== Fate ==
On 2 August 1806, the French Navy frigates Sirène, Capitaine de frégate Le Duc, and Revanche, Capitaine de frégate Lambert, captured Holderness, Swan, master, and Blenheim, Welburn, master, both of and for Hull, off Greenland. The French burnt their captures.
