= HMS Redoubt (1793) =

British floating battery

History

Great Britain
- Name: HMS Redoubt
- Acquired: March 1793 by purchase
- Fate: Sold 1802

General characteristics
- Tons burthen: 3864/94 (bm)
- Length: Overall: 97 ft 5 in (29.7 m); Keel: 81 ft 1 1/8 in (24.7 m)
- Beam: 29 ft 11 in (9.1 m)
- Depth of hold: 12 ft 9 in (3.9 m)
- Complement: 150, or 146 (later)
- Armament: 20 × 42-pounder carronades

HMS Redoubt was the mercantile Rover, which the Royal Navy purchased in March 1793 on the outbreak of war with France. The Navy fitted her as a floating battery. It sold her in 1802.

== Career ==
After Redoubt underwent fitting at Woolwich between April and July 1793, Captain Alexander Fraser commissioned her in August for Flushing and Ostend.

On 10 May 1794 Commander William Carthew was promoted to post captain. In June he took command of Redoubt at North Shields.

Commander George Byng was promoted to post captain on 18 June 1795, into Redoubt. At the time Redoubt was stationed on the River Tyne. There he helped the ship owners by suppressing an "unlawful combination of the seamen" aimed at "extorting exorbitant wages." For his role, Byng received the thanks of the Trinity House at Newcastle, the Corporation of North Shields, and the shipowners of those places.

Captain George Dundas replaced Byng in November. Redoubt moved to the Humber station in January 1797.

On 30 July 1797, the whaler Blenheim, William Mitchenson, master, arrived back at Hull from Davis Strait. As she arrived the guardship HMS Nonsuch fired a shot to signal Blenheim to come to. Mitchenson ignored that signal, and several other shots. When Blenheim arrived at the port's haven, boats from Nonsuch, Redoubt, and Nautilus surrounded her. As the boats approached with the intent to board, Blenheim's crew pelted them with spears, capstan bars, handspikes, other offensive weapons, and also several large iron shot. The boats withdrew, but not before three men from Nonsuch were wounded, two mortally. Blenheim's crew got to shore and absconded. The government promised to pardon all of the members of the crew other than those that had actually murdered the two men from Nonsuch. The reason the whalers resisted is that they wished to avoid impressment by the Royal Navy. The crew of out-bound merchantmen and whalers were generally exempt from the Press; the crew of returning vessels, however, were subject to impressment.

Captain James Keith Shephard received his promotion to post captain on 30 July 1798, and was appointed to command Redoubt.

From December 1799 Redoubt was stationed at the Nore.

On 4 August 1801 Redoubt and two gun brigs were lying at Shellness Point, Isle of Sheppey, guarding the entrance to Faversham.

She was paid off in April 1802.

== Fate ==
The "Principal Officers and Commissioners of His Majesty's Navy" offered "Redoubt, 26 guns, 386 Tons", lying at Sheerness, for sale on 20 May 1802. She sold for £1,030.
