= Hired armed lugger Royalist =

The hired armed lugger Royalist served the Royal Navy from 1798 to 1800 and she was armed with eight guns. She may have been built in 1798.

Royalist apparently served at Jersey with Aristocrat and Daphne in a small squadron under the command of Commodore Philippe d'Auvergne in Bravo. Royalist's commander, as of 1 January 1799, was Lieutenant Jackson Dowsing. He had earlier served on the same station and in the same role on Repulse.
