= HMS Tiger (1794) =

History

Great Britain
- Name: HMS Tiger
- Acquired: 3 February 1794 (by purchase)
- Fate: Sold 1798

General characteristics
- Type: Hoy
- Tons burthen: 80 (bm)
- Length: 67 ft 8 in (20.62 m) (overall); 59 ft 0 7/8 in (18.0 m) (keel)
- Beam: 16 ft 0 in (4.88 m)
- Depth of hold: 6 ft 82 in (3.91 m)
- Propulsion: Sails
- Sail plan: sloop
- Complement: 30
- Armament: 1 × 24-pounder gun + 3 × 32-pounder carronades

HMS Tiger was a Dutch hoy that the Admiralty purchased in 1794. She was commissioned into the Royal Navy in April 1794 under Lieutenant Joseph Withers for the Channel Islands. She and several of her sister ships (Lion, Eagle, Repulse, and Scorpion), formed part of a short-lived squadron under Philippe d'Auvergne at Jersey.

She was paid off in December 1795 and sold in 1798.
