= Gardiner and Joseph (1802 ship) =

History

United Kingdom
- Name: Gardiner and Joseph
- Owner: J.Egginton
- Builder: Hull
- Launched: 1802
- Fate: Wrecked in November 1808

General characteristics
- Tons burthen: 327, or 372 (bm)
- Armament: 8 × 6&4-pounder guns

Gardiner and Joseph (or Gardener and Joseph, or Gardner and Joseph) was launched at Hull in 1802. She made seven voyages as a whaler in the northern whale fishery until she was wrecked in November 1808.

== Career ==
Gardner & Joseph first appeared in Lloyd's Register (LR) for 1802 with Js.Allen, master, Foggintons, owner, and trade Hull–Davis Strait. (Later LR corrected the burthen to 372 tons and the ownership to Eggingtons.)

In 1802, Gardiner and Joseph brought in the second largest catch of the season.

On 4 March 1803 Lloyd's List (LL) reported that Holderness and Gardner & Joseph had been on their way to Davis Strait when they had had to put back to Hull having lost anchors and cables, and having sustained other damage.

The following data is from Coltish, supplemented by data from LR and the Register of Shipping (RS):

| Year | Master | Where | Whales | Tuns whale oil |
|---|---|---|---|---|
| 1802 | Allen | Davis Strait | | 200 |
| 1803 | Allen | Davis Strait | | 75 |
| 1804 | Allen | Davis Strait | | 165 |
| 1805 | Storey | Davis Strait | | |
| 1806 (Note: Gardiner and Joseph, Story, master, was the second most successful whaler of the season. By one report, she took 12 whales, which yielded 450 butts of oil.) | J.Storey | Davis Strait | 12 | 182 |
| 1807 (Note: Gardiner and Joseph, Story, master, was the second most successful whaler from Hull of the season. By one report, she took 14 whales, which yielded 500 butts of oil. However, the vessels that fished off Greenland had better results.) | J.Storey | Davis Strait | | 193 |
| 1808 | J.Storey; J.Dick | Davis Strait | | 227 |

Gardner & Joseph was off Whitby from Davis Strait on 8 August 1808, and she arrived back at Hull on 10 August.

Both LR and the RS for 1809 (published in 1808), showed her master as J. Dick and that she had had damages repaired in 1806. However, LR now showed her trade as Hull–Quebec.

== Fate ==
In November 1808 Gardiner and Joseph was driven ashore in the Saint Lawrence River. Gardner and Joseph was on a voyage from Quebec City to London.

Her owners replaced her with another ship, Gardiner and Joseph, launched at Hull in 1810.
