= HMS Lion (1794) =

Sloop of the Royal Navy

History

Great Britain
- Name: HMS Lion
- Acquired: 3 February 1794 (by purchase)
- Fate: Sold 1795

General characteristics
- Type: Hoy
- Tons burthen: 74 (bm)
- Length: Overall: 67 ft 0 in (20.4 m); Keel: 60 ft 9 in (18.5 m)
- Beam: 15 ft 1 1/4 in (4.6 m)
- Depth of hold: 6 ft 7 in (2.0 m)
- Propulsion: Sails
- Sail plan: sloop
- Complement: 30
- Armament: 1 × 24-pounder gun + 3 × 32-pounder carronades

HMS Lion was a Dutch hoy that the Admiralty purchased in 1794. She was commissioned into the Royal Navy in March 1794 under Lieutenant Stephen Donovan. She and several of her sister ships (Eagle, Repulse, Tiger, and Scorpion), formed part of a short-lived squadron under Philippe d'Auvergne at Jersey. The navy sold her at Jersey on 20 November 1795.
