= HMS Eagle (1794) =

1794 hoy of the Royal Navy

History

Great Britain
- Name: HMS Eagle
- Acquired: 3 February 1794 (by purchase)
- Fate: Sold 1804

General characteristics
- Type: Hoy
- Tons burthen: 71 (bm)
- Length: 67 ft 9 in (20.7 m) (overall); 60 ft 2 3/4 in (18.4 m) (keel)
- Beam: 14 ft 10 1/2 in (4.5 m)
- Depth of hold: 7 ft 3 in (2.2 m)
- Propulsion: Sails
- Sail plan: sloop
- Complement: 30
- Armament: 1 × 24-pounder gun; 3 × 32-pounder carronades

HMS Eagle was a Dutch hoy that the Admiralty purchased in 1794. She was commissioned into the Royal Navy in March 1794 under Lieutenant David Hamline for the Channel Islands. She and several of her sister ships — (Lion, Repulse, Tiger, and Scorpion) — formed part of a short-lived squadron under Philippe d'Auvergne at Jersey in the Channel Islands. Eagle was paid off in 1795 and then lent to the Royal Navy's Transport Board in March 1796.

Eagle was recommissioned in September 1796 under Lieutenant Henry Hardacre. On 31 January 1799, she was driven ashore in Studland Bay on the coast of the Isle of Purbeck in Dorset in England, but she was refloated and returned to service. She was one of the vessels that shared in the proceeds of the Vlieter Incident on 28 August 1799. From June 1800 Lieutenant William Nazer commanded Eagle.

The Royal Navy sold Eagle at Portsmouth in November 1804.
