= HMS Scorpion (1794) =

History

Great Britain
- Name: HMS Scorpion
- Acquired: 3 February 1794 (by purchase)
- Fate: Sold 1804

General characteristics
- Type: Hoy
- Tons burthen: 70 (bm)
- Length: 66 ft 5 in (20.24 m) (overall); 58 ft 9 5/8 in (17.9 m) (keel)
- Beam: 14 ft 11 in (4.55 m)
- Depth of hold: 6 ft 8 1/2 in (2.045 m)
- Propulsion: Sails
- Sail plan: sloop
- Complement: 30
- Armament: 1 × 24-pounder gun + 3 × 32-pounder carronades

HMS Scorpion was a Dutch hoy that the Admiralty purchased in 1794. She was commissioned into the Royal Navy in March 1794 under Lieutenant Thomas Crocker for the Channel Islands. She and several of her sister ships (Lion, Eagle, Repulse, and Tiger), formed part of a short-lived squadron under Philippe d'Auvergne at Jersey.

She was paid off in 1795, but recommissioned in September under Lieutenant George Bell. In June 1799 Lieutenant William Osborn assumed command. She was at Poole in 1801 and 1802.

The navy sold her in November 1804 at Portsmouth.
