= French frigate Revanche =

Romaine class frigate

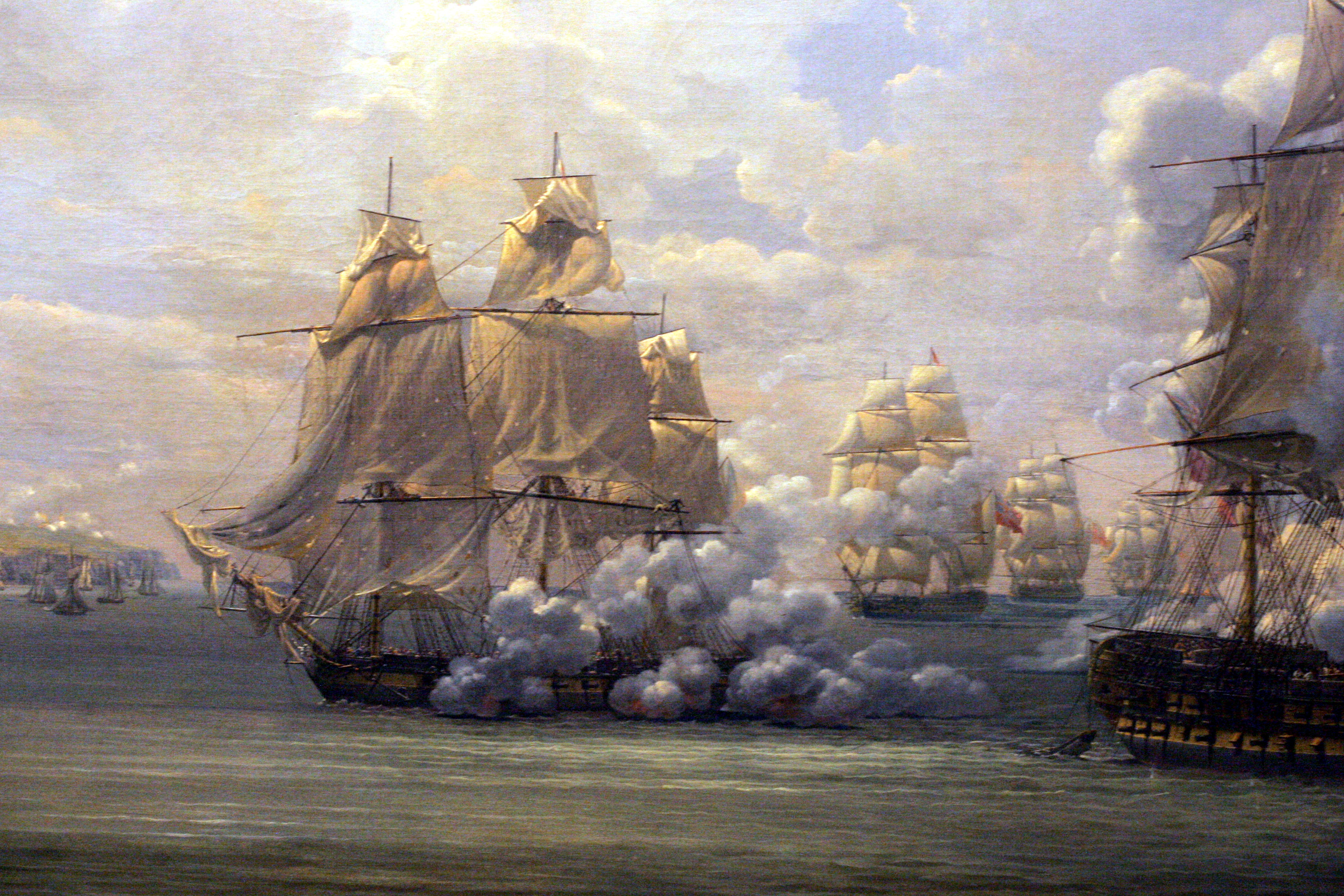
- Poursuivante, sister ship of Revanche

History

France
- Name: Revanche
- Builder: Dieppe
- Laid down: March 1794
- Launched: 31 August 1795
- Completed: December 1795
- Fate: Deleted 1818 or 1819

General characteristics
- Class & type: Romaine-class frigate
- Displacement: 700 tonnes
- Length: 45.5 m (149 ft 3 in)
- Beam: 11.8 m (38 ft 9 in)
- Draught: 5 m (16 ft 5 in)
- Propulsion: Sail
- Armament: 24 × 24-pounder guns; 16 × 8-pounder guns

Revanche was a Romaine-class frigate of the French Navy.

On 2 August 1806 Revanche, capitaine de frégate Lambert, and Sirène, capitaine de frégate Le Duc, captured the Greenland whalers Holderness, Swan, master, and Blenheim, Welburn, master, both of and for Hull. The French burnt their captures.

On 12 March 1811, Revanche and Prégel captured the British sloop HMS Challenger.
