= Gardiner and Joseph (1810 ship) =

History

United KingdomUnited Kingdom
- Name: Gardiner and Joseph
- Builder: Hull
- Launched: 1810
- Fate: Foundered 9 October 1824

General characteristics
- Tons burthen: 360 (bm)
- Armament: 8 × 9-pounder carronades

Gardiner and Joseph (or Gardener and Joseph, or Gardner and Joseph) was launched at Hull in 1810. She made 11 voyages to Greenland or Davis Strait as a whaler in the northern whale fishery. She then traded briefly between Hull and North America. She foundered on 9 October 1824.

== Career ==
She was a replacement for her owners's Gardiner and Joseph, launched at Hull in 1802 and lost in 1808.

Gardner & Joseph first appeared in Lloyd's Register (LR) for 1810 with Holberry, master, Eggingtons, owner, and trade Hull–Davis Strait.

The following data is from Coltish, supplemented by data from Lloyd's List (LL), LR, and the Register of Shipping (RS):

| Year | Master | Where | Whales | Tuns whale oil |
|---|---|---|---|---|
| 1811 | Holberry | Davis Strait | 8 | 113 |
| 1812 | Holberry | Davis Strait | 6 or 19? | 80 |
| 1813 | Holberry | Greenland | 16 | 150 |
| 1814 | Holberry | Greenland | 20 | 165 |
| 1815 | Holberry | Greenland | 2 | 18 |
| 1816 | Holberry | Greenland | 5 | 64 |
| 1817 | Kirby | Davis Strait | 7 | 101 |
| 1818 | Kirby | Davis Strait | 4 | 43 |
| 1819 | Kirby | Davis Strait | 6 | 102 |
| 1820 | Angus | Greenland | 9 | 92 (or 206 butts) |
| 1821 | Angus | Greenland | 7 + 2000 seals | 84 (or 190 butts) |

== Fate ==
Gardner and Joseph ceased whaling. She was last listed in LR in 1824 with trade Hull–America and in the RS in 1825 with trade Hull–Quebec.

Her crew abandoned Gardiner and Joseph, Foster, master, in the Atlantic Ocean on 9 October 1824, at 49°N 16°W. Paragon, Simpson, master, rescued her crew. (Note: Paragon, of 357 tons (bm), B.Simpson, master, Holt & Co., owners, had been launched at Lancaster in 1824.) Gardner & Joseph was on a voyage from Hull to Saint John, New Brunswick.
