= HMS Repulse (1794) =

History

Great Britain
- Name: HMS Repulse
- Acquired: 3 February 1794 (by purchase)
- Fate: Broken up 1795

General characteristics
- Type: Hoy
- Tons burthen: 54 (bm)
- Length: 63 ft 0 in (19.20 m) (overall); 55 ft 2 in (16.8 m) (keel)
- Beam: 13 ft 7 1/2 in (4.153 m)
- Depth of hold: 6 ft 1 in (1.85 m)
- Propulsion: Sails
- Sail plan: sloop
- Complement: 30
- Armament: 1 × 24-pounder gun + 3 × 32-pounder carronades

HMS Repulse was a Dutch hoy that the Admiralty purchased in 1794. She was commissioned into the Royal Navy in March 1794 under Lieutenant George Hill. She and several of her sister ships – (Lion, Eagle, Scorpion, and Tiger) – formed part of a short-lived squadron under Philippe d'Auvergne at Jersey.

In 1795 she served in the Channel under the command of Lieutenant Jackson Dowsing. The navy sold her in April 1795 for breaking up.
