= Patent (1803 ship) =

History

United Kingdom
- Name: Patent
- Launched: 1803, Lynn
- Fate: Wrecked 19 & 21 October 1819

General characteristics
- Tons burthen: 223 (bm)
- Armament: 1808: 2 × 6-pounder guns + 8 × 12-pounder carronades; 1810:4 × 6-pounder guns + 8 × 9-pounder carronades; 1814: 6 guns
- Notes: American oak

Patent was launched at Lynn in 1803. During her career French privateers captured her twice, and the French Navy captured her once. Two of the captures took place in 1812. The British Royal Navy recaptured her twice, and her French Navy captors released her. She also captured but lost a valuable American ship. She was wrecked in 1819.

== Career ==
Patent first appeared in Lloyd's Register (LR) in 1803.

Year	Master	Owner	Trade	Source
1803	R.Barugh	Gillespie	Lynn	LR
1804	R.Barugh	Gillespie	Lynn; New Providence	LR

On 29 December 1806 General Perpignon [sic] captured Patent, Barugh, master, at 49°48′N 8°30′W as Patent was on her way from New Providence to London. However the gun-brig HMS Sharp Shooter and the hired armed cutter Britannia recaptured Patent and sent her into Plymouth.

On 5 April 1808 Patent was among a handful of vessels in Margate Roads that lost their cables and anchors. Patent was on her way from Liverpool to London.

Year	Master	Owner	Trade	Source
1808	R.Barugh; Anderson	Gillespie	London–New Providence; London–Jamaica	LR
1810	Anderson; G.Smale	Gillespie	London–New Providence; London–Pensacola	LR

In January or February 1812 the French captured Patent, Gillespie, master. Diana recaptured Patent on 4 February. Patent arrived at Plymouth on 6 February. A fuller account from Plymouth dated 11 February reports that a French privateer had captured Patent, Smale late master, as she was returning from New Providence with logwood. The privateer took Smale and 10 of his crew off. Shortly thereafter Diana encountered Patent and chased her for three days before the French prize crew ran her aground on the French coast at low tide. At high tide the sailors from Diana were able to use casks to refloat Patent and work her out with little damage. (Note: Her cargo was offered for sale on 8 May at Plymouth. It consisted of 44 bales of Bahama cotton wool, 191 tons of fustick, eight tons of Brazeletto (Casalpinia crista – Antilles Brazil wood), 24 tons of Lignum vitae, four logs of Honduras mahogany, and one case of Cortex Cascarilla (cascarilla bark). Cargo of foreign origin for export only consisted of 354 pipes and nine hogsheads of Spanish wine and two pipes of brandy. Cargo of foreign origin eligible for domestic sale consisted of two and a half tons of cork wood.)

Between 21 February 1812 and 17 May, a three-vessel French squadron consisting of the frigates Ariane and Andromaque, and the brig Mameluck engaged in commerce raiding in the Atlantic. They captured numerous British and American vessels and burnt them all, except for Patent, M'Master, master, and Woodrup, Sims, master. They made a cartel of Patent, putting their British prisoners aboard her; she arrived at Plymouth on 24 May. The French put their American prisoners on Woodrop, which they sent to America. Returning to Lorient, the squadron met the British 74-gun ship-of-the-line HMS Northumberland, Captain Henry Hotham. In the ensuing action of 22 May 1812, the two frigates ran aground trying to escape their much stronger opponent. Their crews set their frigates afire to prevent the frigates's capture.

On 14 September, Patent was near Bermuda when her mate and a boat crew took possession of Hannibal, Hunt, master, which was sailing to America from Java. Hannibal was carrying a cargo of tea and other things, and $500,000. Patent arrived at Portsmouth from Jamaica, but Hannibal made her escape. Patent detained and brought into Portsmouth the supercargo, mate, and boat crew from Hannibal that had come aboard Patent for provisions.

Year	Master	Owner	Trade	Source & notes
1813	M.Master; J.Rewells	Gillespie	Falmouth–West Indies	LR; damages repaired 1812
1814	J.Rewells	Brown & Co.	London transport	LR; damages repaired 1812
1816	J.Rewells; Barongh	Brown & Co.	London transport	LR; damages repaired 1812 & good repair 1813
1818	R.Ward	R.Harrison	Hull–New York	LR; good repair 1817

== Fate ==
Patent, Ward, master, was driven ashore on 17 October 1819 on the coast of Lincolnshire and severely damaged. She had nine feet of water in her hold and had to discharge her cargo. She was on a voyage from Riga to Hull. A gale on 21 October totally wrecked her.
