= Jean-Baptiste-Henri Féretier =

Captain Jean-Baptiste-Henri Féretier (18 December 1765 – 11 January 1832) was a French Navy officer who served in the French Revolutionary and Napoleonic Wars.

== Early life ==
Son of Jean Féretier, a master tailor in Nantes, he married, in 1806, Louise Modeste Bellanger, niece of Mathieu Augustin Cornet.

== Naval career ==
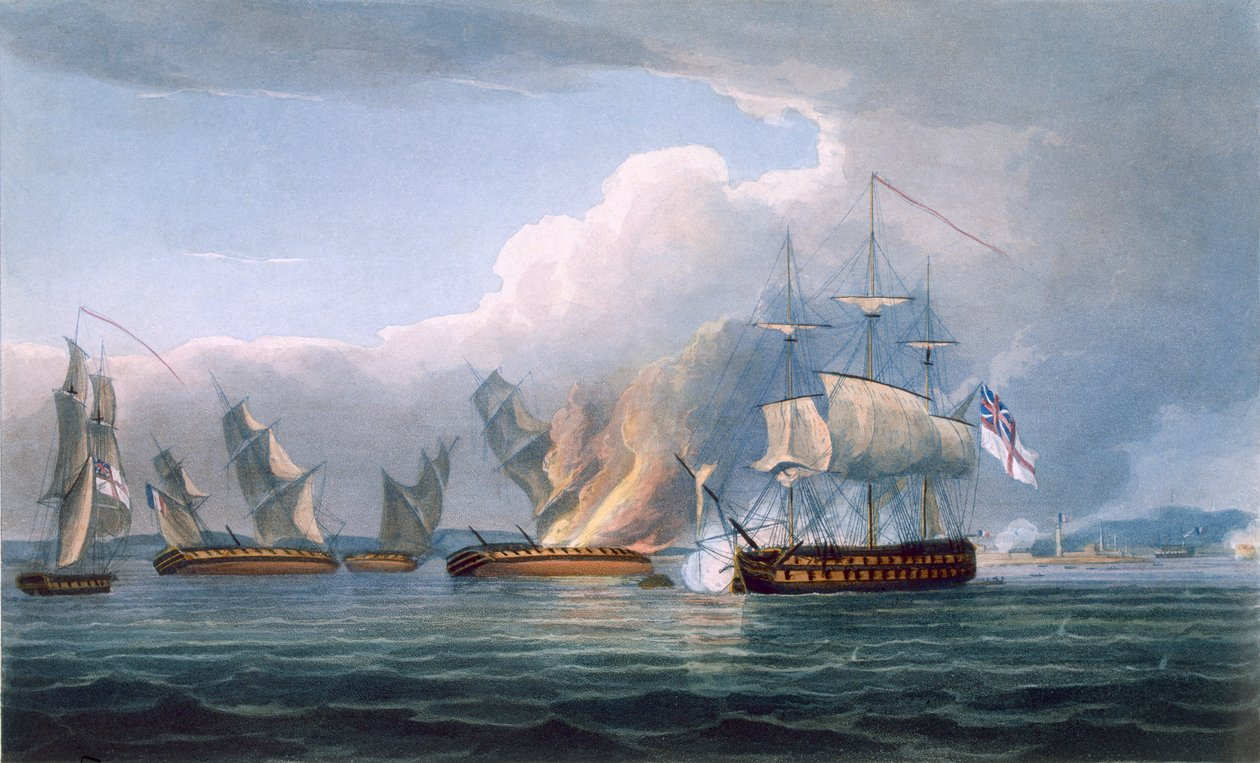
The action of 22 May 1812, which Féretier fought in

Féretier became an ensign in 1795 on board of the corvette 'L'Insolent', rose to lieutenant in 1803. He took command of the frigate Caroline when her commander, Captain Billard, died. He captained her at the action of 31 May 1809 when he captured two East Indiamen, Streatham and Europe. During the British raid on Saint-Paul he beached and abandoned his frigate to avoid being captured. Brenton (p. 399) incorrectly states that Féretier committed suicide following the loss of his ship but James (p. 200) refutes this statement, affirming that Nicolas Ernault des Bruslys was the only known suicide during the campaign. He was promoted to commander in 1810. In December 1811, now at the rank of captain, he was appointed commander of a squadron by Napoleon.

Féretier commanded the frigate Ariane. The squadron also comprised the Andromaque, under Captain Nicolas Morice, and the 16-gun Mamelouk, under Captain Galbert. The squadron raided American commerce, capturing a number of prizes. The campaign was successful, but as they returned to Lorient, on 22 May 1812, the squadron met the 74-gun HMS Northumberland, resulting in the action of 22 May 1812. After a gunnery exchange, Andromaque caught fire, and both frigates ran aground to save their crew; Andromaque exploded soon afterwards, and Ariane was set afire to prevent her capture. Féretier and Morice were court-martialed for the loss of their ships, stripped of their rank and barred from commanding a ship for three years. They were however quickly reintegrated. Feretier died on 11 January 1832 in Nantes.

== Honours ==
- Legion of Honour
- Order of Saint Louis in 1814.

== Sources and references ==
- Sources : AN – BB4 – 353
- Roche, Jean-Michel (2005). Dictionnaire des bâtiments de la flotte de guerre française de Colbert à nos jours, 1671 - 1870. Group Retozel-Maury Millau. p. 99. ISBN 978-2-9525917-0-6. OCLC 165892922.
- Brenton, Edward Pelham (1825). The Naval History of Great Britain, Vol. IV. C. Rice.
