= French frigate Andromaque (1811) =

Ariane-class frigate of the French Navy

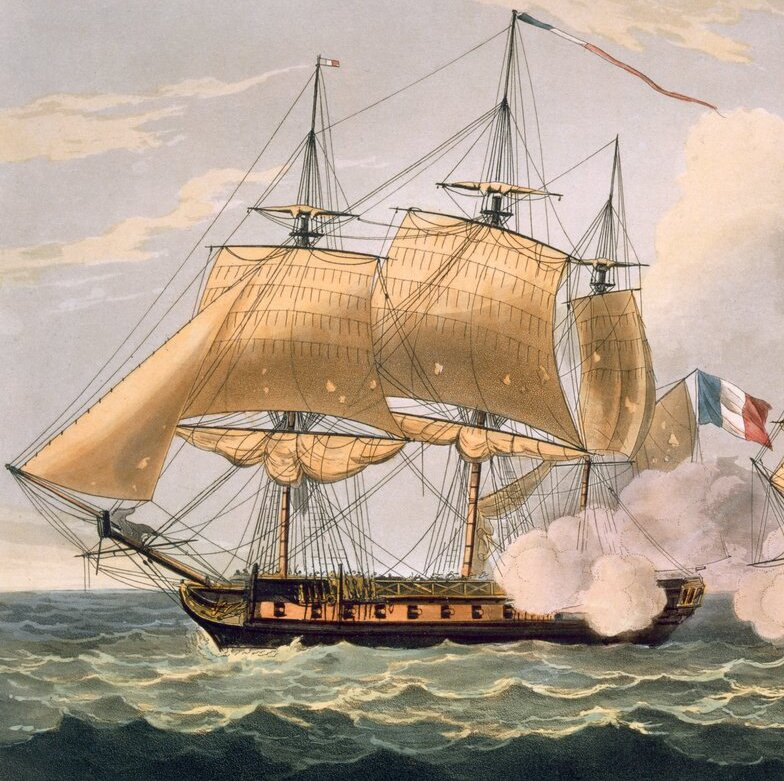
- Clorinde, a sister ship of Andromaque

History

France
- Name: Andromaque
- Namesake: Andromache
- Ordered: 10 November 1808
- Builder: Nantes
- Laid down: 1808
- Launched: 1811
- Commissioned: 1 August 1811
- Fate: Ran aground, burned, and scuttled 22 May 1812

General characteristics
- Class & type: Ariane-class frigate
- Length: 45.5 m (149 ft 3 in)
- Beam: 12.36 m (40 ft 7 in)
- Draught: 5.9 m (19 ft 4 in)
- Sail plan: Full-rigged ship, 1,950 m^{2} (21,000 sq ft)
- Complement: 325
- Armament: 46 guns: Battery: 28 × 18-pounder long guns; Quarterdeck and forecastle: 4 × 8-pounder long guns; 12 × 18-pounder carronades

Andromaque was a 40-gun Ariane-class frigate of the French Navy.

== Career ==
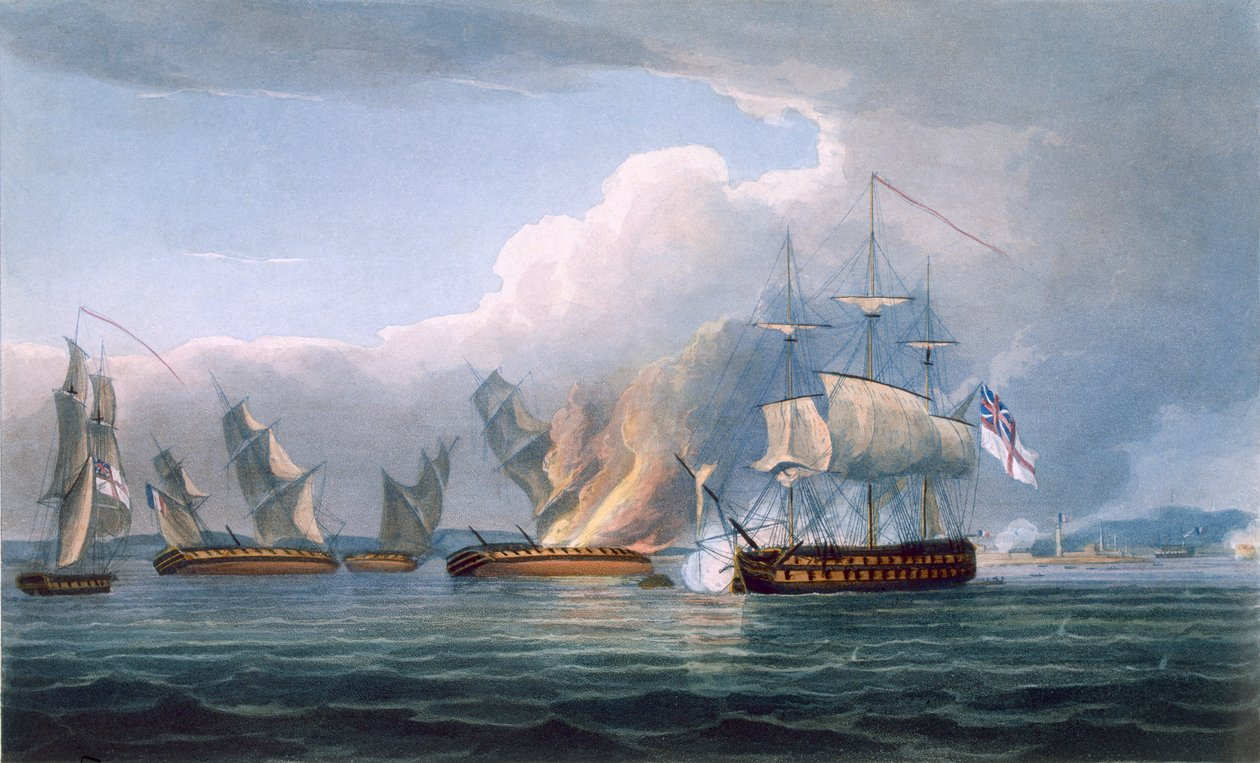
Ariane aground (second from left), Andromaque ablaze and sinking (second right), and HMS Northumberland (right) on 22 May 1812.

Ariane was commissioned on 1 August 1811 under Captain Nicolas Morice.

Between 21 February 1812 and 17 May, a three-vessel French squadron consisting of the frigates Ariane and Andromaque, and the brig Mameluck engaged in commerce raiding in the Atlantic. They captured numerous British and American vessels and burnt them all, except for Patent, M'Master, master, and Woodrup, Sims, master. They made a cartel of Patent, putting their British prisoners aboard her; she arrived at Plymouth on 24 May. The American prisoners the French put on Woodrop, which they sent to America.

Returning to Lorient, the squadron encountered the British 74-gun ship-of-the-line HMS Northumberland, Captain Henry Hotham. In the ensuing Action of 22 May 1812, the two frigates ran aground trying to escape their much stronger opponent, and were set afire to prevent their capture.

== See also ==
- List of French sail frigates
