= Pallas-class frigate (1808) =

1808 class of French frigates

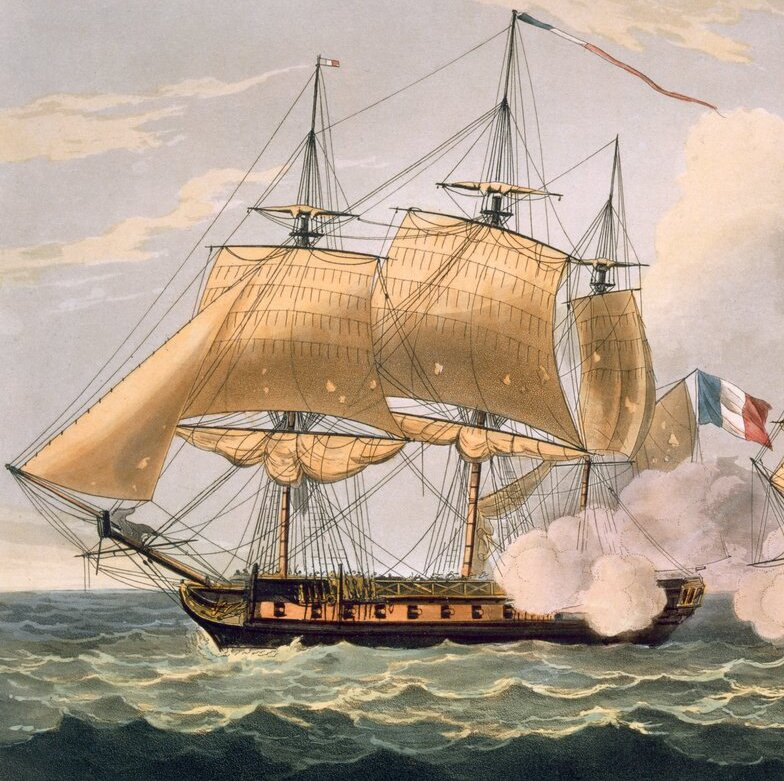
- Clorinde

Class overview
- Name: Pallas
- Operators: French Navy
- Preceded by: Hortense class
- Subclasses: Ariane
- Planned: 62
- Completed: 57
- Cancelled: 5

General characteristics
- Class & type: Pallas-class frigate
- Displacement: 1,080 tonnes
- Length: 46.93 m (154 ft 0 in)
- Beam: 11.91 m (39 ft 1 in)
- Draught: 5.9 m (19 ft 4 in)
- Propulsion: 1,950 m^{2} (21,000 sq ft) of sail
- Complement: 326
- Armament: Nominally 40 guns; In practice carried either 44 or 46 guns: Battery: 28 18-pounders; Quarterdeck & forecastle: 8 × 8-pounder long guns; 8 × 36-pounder carronades or 12 × 18-pounder carronades

The Pallas class constituted the standard design of 40-gun frigates of the French Navy during the Napoleonic Empire period. Jacques-Noël Sané designed them in 1805, as a development of his seven-ship Hortense class of 1802, and over the next eight years the Napoléonic government ordered in total 62 frigates to be built to this new design. Of these some 54 were completed, although ten of them were begun for the French Navy in shipyards within the French-occupied Netherlands or Italy, which were then under French occupation; these latter ships were completed for the Netherlands or Austrian navies after 1813.

== Ships launched in 1807 (1) ==
Note – Corona was completed for the Napoleonic Italian Navy, but transferred to the French Navy in April 1810.

- Corona

Builder: Battistella, Venice
Ordered: 26 March 1805
Laid down: 26 December 1806
Launched: 27 December 1807
Completed: December 1808
Fate: Captured by the British Navy at the Battle of Lissa on 13 March 1811.

== Ships launched in 1808 (7) ==
- Pallas

Builder: Mathurin & Antoine Crucy, Basse-Indre (near Nantes)
Ordered: 26 March 1805
Laid down: October 1805
Launched: 9 April 1808
Completed: June 1808
Fate: Stricken 8 November 1821 at Brest and hulked, and broken up 1841

- Elbe

Builder: Mathurin & Antoine Crucy, Basse-Indre
Ordered: 26 March 1805 as Aréthuse
Laid down: October 1805, renamed Elbe May 1807
Launched: 23 May 1808
Completed: July 1809
Fate: Renamed Calypso August 1814. Condemned 1825 and taken to pieces c.1841.

- Amélie

Builder: Toulon
Ordered: 10 October 1807
Laid down: November 1807
Launched: 21 July 1808
Completed: January 1809
Fate: Renamed Junon April 1814. Condemned 1842.

- Clorinde

Builder: Louis & Michel-Louis Crucy, Paimboeuf
Ordered: 19 July 1806
Laid down: July 1806
Launched: 6 August 1808
Completed: March 1809
Fate: Captured by the British Navy in February 1814, becoming HMS Aurora.

- Renommée

Builder: Mathurin & Antoine Crucy, Basse-Indre
Ordered: 26 March 1805
Launched: 20 August 1808
Fate: Captured by the British Navy in May 1811, becoming HMS Java; later captured by US Navy in December 1812.

- Élisa

Builder: Le Havre
Ordered: 20 May 1806
Laid down: August 1806
Launched: 22 September 1810
Fate: Wrecked on 22 December 1810 near Réville

- Favorita

Note – Favorita was completed for the Napoleonic Italian Navy, but transferred to the French Navy in April 1810.
Builder: Venice
Ordered: 1806
Launched: 4 October 1810
Fate: Renamed Favorite in April 1810 (on transfer). Burnt at Battle of Lissa March 1811.

== Ships launched in 1809 (3) ==
- Astrée

Builder: Cherbourg
Ordered: 1808
Launched: May 1809
Fate: Captured by the British Navy in December 1810, becoming HMS Pomone.

- Fidèle

Builder: Vlissingen (Flushing)
Ordered: 14 August 1806
Launched: June 1809
Fate: Captured by the British Navy in August 1809, becoming HMS Laurel.

- Adrienne

Builder: Toulon
Ordered: 10 October 1807
Launched: 15 August 1809
Fate: Renamed Aurore in April 1814, then Dauphine in September 1829 and Aurore again in August 1830. Converted to a transport 1841.

== Ships launched in 1810 (4) ==
- Nymphe

Builder: Mathurin & Antoine Crucy, Basse-Indre
Ordered: 25 April 1807
Launched: 1 May 1810
Fate: Converted to a breakwater 1832

- Iphigénie

Builder: Cherbourg
Ordered: 1809
Launched: 20 May 1810
Fate: Captured by the Royal Navy in January 1814, becoming first HMS Palma and then HMS Gloire. before being sold in 1817.

- Méduse

Builder: Paimboeuf
Ordered: 11 March 1807
Launched: 1 July 1810
Fate: Wrecked in July 1816.

- Prégel

Builder: Saint Malo
Ordered: 1807
Launched: 30 October 1810
Fate: Renamed Eurydice August 1814. Deleted 1825.

== Ships launched in 1811 (9) ==
- Ariane

Builder: Mathurin & Antoine Crucy, Basse-Indre
Ordered: 25 April 1807
Launched: 7 April 1811
Fate: Burnt to avoid capture in the action of 22 May 1812.

- Médée

Builder: Genoa
Ordered: 1808
Launched: 5 May 1811
Fate: Hulked 1849. Renamed Muiron 1850. Burnt 1882.

- Andromaque

Builder: Mathurin & Antoine Crucy, Basse-Indre
Ordered: 10 November 1808
Launched: 21 May 1811
Fate: Sunk in the action of 22 May 1812.

- Yssel

Builder: Amsterdam
Ordered:
Launched: May 1811
Fate: Transferred to Netherlands 1814.

- Carolina

Builder: Naples
Ordered: 1807
Launched: 16 June 1811
Fate: Transferred to the Neapolitan Navy in December 1813.

- Princesse de Bologne

Builder: Venice
Ordered:
Launched: 5 September 1811
Fate: Transferred to the Austrian Navy in April 1814, becoming their Lipsia.

- Gloire

Builder: Le Havre
Ordered: 26 December 1808
Launched: 3 November 1811
Fate: Condemned 1822.

- Illyrienne

Builder: Saint Malo
Ordered: 26 December 1808
Launched: 13 November 1811
Fate: Renamed Hermione 30 August 1814; stricken 14 April 1841.

- Meuse

Builder: Amsterdam
Ordered: 1810 as Alcide, renamed September 1810 before being laid down
Launched: 17 December 1811
Fate: Transferred to the Netherlands Navy in May 1814, becoming their Maas.

== Ships launched in 1812 (14) ==
- Terpsichore

Builder: Antwerp
Ordered: 1810
Launched: 26 February 1812
Fate: Captured by the fourth rate HMS Majestic in February 1814, becoming HMS Modeste; she was broken up in 1816

- Érigone

Builder: Antwerp
Ordered: 1810
Launched: 25 March 1812

- Aréthuse

Builder: Paimboeuf
Ordered: 26 December 1808
Launched: 11 April 1812
Fate: Converted to a 28-gun corvette 1833–1834. Stricken 1851 and broken up after 1865.

- Galatée

Builder: Genoa
Ordered: 1808
Launched: 3 May 1812
Fate: Stricken at Toulon 6 May 1837.

- Jahde

Builder: Rotterdam
Ordered:
Launched: 9 May 1812

- Trave

Builder: Amsterdam
Ordered:
Launched: 12 May 1812

- Weser

Builder: Amsterdam
Ordered:
Launched: 12 May 1812

- Melpomène

Builder: Toulon
Ordered: 18 January 1810
Launched: 17 May 1812

- Rubis

Builder: Mathurin & Antoine Crucy, Basse-Indre
Ordered: 21 October 1809
Launched: 25 May 1812

- Ems

Builder: Rotterdam
Ordered:
Launched: 26 May 1812

- Atalante

Builder: Lorient – Caudan
Ordered: 1 July 1809 as Eurydice but renamed 1811
Launched: 24 June 1812

- Cérès

Builder: Brest
Ordered:
Launched: 12 August 1812

- Piave

Builder: Venice
Ordered:
Launched: 15 August 1812

- Dryade

Builder: Genoa
Ordered: 1811
Launched: 4 October 1812

== Ships launched in 1813 (4) ==
- Sultane

Builder: Paimboeuf
Ordered: 21 October 1809
Launched: 30 May 1813
Fate: Captured by the British Navy March 1814, becoming HMS Sultane.

- Étoile

Builder: Paimboeuf
Ordered: 21 October 1810 as Hyménée, but renamed before being laid down.
Launched: 28 July 1813
Fate: Captured by the British Navy in March 1814, becoming HMS Topaze.

- Rancune

Builder: Toulon
Ordered: 20 February 1812
Launched: 30 September 1813
Fate: Renamed Néréide about August 1814. Condemned 1825.

- Amphitrite

Builder: Venice
Ordered:
Launched: 7 November 1815
Fate: Still incomplete in April 1814 when Venice was captured by the Austrians. Then renamed Anfitrite and later Augusta in the Austrian Navy.

== Ships launched in 1814 (3) ==
As noted below, all three vessels launched in 1814 were never added to the French Navy, as they were completed for the Dutch after the liberation of the Netherlands.

- Amstel

Builder: Rotterdam
Ordered:
Launched: 13 September 1814
Fate: Completed for the Netherlands Navy in 1816, becoming their Amster.

- Ambitieuse

Builder: Amsterdam
Ordered:
Launched: November 1814
Fate: Completed for the Netherlands Navy in 1816, becoming their Koningen, later Wilhelmina.

- Immortelle

Builder: Amsterdam
Ordered:
Launched: November 1814
Fate: Completed for the Netherlands Navy in 1816, becoming their Frederica Sophia Wilhelmina.

== Ships launched after 1814 (12) ==
Six of the following were completed for the French Navy after the restoration of the Bourbon monarchy; the other six, laid down in Rotterdam and Venice while those cities were under French control, were completed for the Netherlands and Austrian Navies respectively.

- Cybèle

Builder: Le Havre
Ordered: 1810
Launched: 11 April 1815
Fate: Completed 1816. Hulked 1850 as Remise.

- Duchesse de Berry

Builder: Lorient – Caudan
Ordered: 1810 as Didon, renamed at launch.
Launched: 25 August 1816
Fate: Completed 1817. Hulked 1829 and renamed Victoire in August 1830.

- Vestale

Builder: Rotterdam
Ordered:
Launched: October 1816
Fate: Completed for the Netherlands Navy in 1818, becoming their Vestale, later (1828) Rhijn.

- Fidèle

Builder: Rotterdam
Ordered:
Launched: 22 November 1817
Fate: Completed for the Netherlands Navy in 1819, becoming their Schelde.

- Constance

Builder: Brest
Ordered:
Launched: 2 September 1818
Fate: Completed 1823. Hulked 1836.

- Thétis

Builder: Toulon
Ordered: 1813
Launched: 3 May 1819
Fate: Completed 1822. Renamed 1865 as Lanninon.

- Astrée

Builder: Paimboeuf originally, then Lorient
Ordered: 25 March 1812
Launched: 28 April 1820
Fate: Completed 1821. Condemned 1842.

- Hébé

Builder: Venice
Ordered:
Launched: 1820
Fate: Completed for the Austrian Navy in 1821, becoming their Ebe.

- Armide

Builder: Paimboeuf originally, then Lorient
Ordered: 25 March 1812
Launched: 1 May 1821
Fate: Completed 1823. Renamed 1866 as Entrepot.

- Moskva

Builder: Venice
Ordered:
Launched: 1827
Fate: Completed for the Austrian Navy in 1828, becoming their Medea.

- Guerrière

Builder: Venice
Ordered:
Launched: 1829
Fate: Completed for the Austrian Navy in 1830, becoming their Juno.

- Vénus

Builder: Venice
Ordered:
Launched: 1832
Fate: Completed for the Austrian Navy in 1833, becoming their Venere.

== Ships never launched (i.e. cancelled) ==
- Corona

Builder: Venice
Begun: August 1812
Fate: Construction abandoned April 1814 at the fall of Venice to the Austrians.

- Inconstante

Builder: Antwerp
Begun: August 1812
Fate: Construction abandoned August 1814 at the fall of Antwerp to the Allies.

- Ruppel

Builder: Antwerp
Begun: September 1812
Fate: Construction abandoned August 1814 at the fall of Antwerp to the Allies.

- Précieuse

Builder: Antwerp
Begun: September 1812
Fate: Construction abandoned August 1814 at the fall of Antwerp to the Allies.

- Istrienne

Builder: Trieste
Begun: April 1813
Fate: Construction abandoned October 1813 at the fall of Trieste to the Austrians.
