= Allemand's escape from Lorient =

- Part of the French Revolutionary Wars
Date	9 March 1812 – 29 March 1812
Location	Lorient - Brest
Result	French victory

Belligerents
France	United Kingdom

Commanders and leaders
Admiral Zacharie Allemand	Admiral John Gore

Strength
4 ships of the line 4 frigates 2 corvettes	4 squadrons

Casualties and losses

Allemand's escape from Lorient was an episode of the naval operations of the French Navy in 1812. A number of French, warships trapped in Lorient by the British blockade, managed to take to the sea under Zacharie Allemand and sail to Brest. British squadrons sailed in pursuit, but were unable to force the French fleet into action.

== Background ==
By 1812, the Royal Navy enjoyed an overwhelming superiority over its French counterpart, which was mostly blockaded in its own ports. The French squadrons were adequately provided with fine warships, but since Willaumez' expedition of 1809, they were confined in the purely passive role of fleet in being, and scarcely left harbour. Furthermore, a variety of incidents had dispersed ships in secondary harbours over the coasts of France, weakening the squadrons.

In 1812, Admiral Zacharie Allemand was appointed by the government to gather the scattered ships into the principal harbour of Brest. Allemand went to Lorient, which was blockaded by British cruisers patrolling off Groix. The British forces there, commanded by John Gore, amounted to four ships of the line, four frigates, and a number of corvettes: the 80-gun HMS Tonnant (flagship); Northumberland under Henry Hotham; HMS Colossus under Thomas Alexander; and HMS Bulwark under Thomas Browne.

Allemand decided to wait and carefully choose the opportunity to make a sortie. He spent five months in Lorient waiting for the ideal moment.

== Allemand's escape from Lorient ==
In the dead of the night of 8 to 9 March, Allemand, his flag on Eylau, sailed with four ships of the line and two corvettes. In addition to his flagship, Allemand's squadron comprised the 74-gun Golymin, Marengo and Vétéran, and the corvettes Diligente and Echo. In the early afternoon, Tonnant detached from the British squadron to reconnoitre the port of Lorient, and found it devoid of warships, except for one two-decker. The next day, Tonnant returned to Lorient and confirmed that Allemand had escaped. Gore returned to his squadron to gather his forces and organise a chase.

At 13:00 on 9 March, the French ships came in view of HMS Diana, under Captain William Ferris, which undertook to shadow them until the next day. In the afternoon of the 10, HMS Pompee, under Captain Sir James Athol Wood, joined the chase. At the same time, and independently, two 74-guns, HMS Tremendous, under Captain Robert Campbell, and HMS Poictiers, under Captain John Poer Beresford, were also chasing the French, having detected them in the morning.

During the night of the tenth of March, Pompee had lost Diana and found herself chased by two sails; she attempted to flee, but was almost overtaken and had to dump 80 tonnes of water under fire to outrun her pursuers. The next morning, Diana, Pompee, Poictiers and Tremendous gathered and again sighted the French squadron; they gave chase until 14:00, when they lost contact in the fog.

On 15 March, the French squadron met the light frigate HMS Nyaden, under Captain Farmery Predam Epworth, which managed to escape in spite of damage to her rigging. She then rushed to warn a convoy of Indiamen to change direction to avoid the French.

Allemand finally arrived at Brest on 29, having eluded the three or four British squadrons that chased him. There, he joined the Nestor and the frigates Méduse, Clorinde, Revanche, Prégel and Nymphe.

== Aftermath ==
The successful transit to Brest allowed the French to reconstitute the core of a fighting fleet. Most of the ships arrived from Lorient were brand new; they comprised one Bucentaure 80-gun ship, and the strong 74-gun Vétéran which, with her upper 24-pounder battery, was almost of the same strength.

Allemand, whose expedition of 1805 had already been nicknamed "invisible squadron" for his effectiveness at eluding British pursuit, came out strengthened in his reputation as a capable and lucky officer.

Nevertheless, neither Allemand nor the squadron of Brest were to conduct any operation of significance.

== Sources and references ==
=== Bibliography ===
- Troude, Onésime-Joachim (1867). Batailles navales de la France. Vol. 4. Challamel ainé. pp. 152–153.
- James, William (2002) [1827]. The Naval History of Great Britain, Volume 1, 1793–1796. London: Conway Maritime Press. ISBN 0-85177-905-0. OCLC 165702223.
