= French frigate Ariane =

Napoleonic Pallas-class frigate

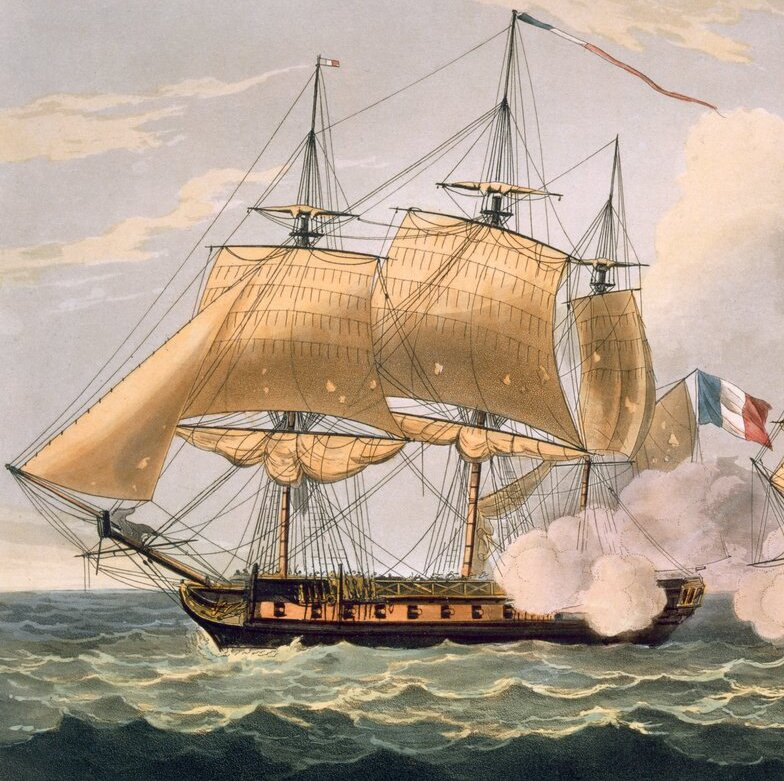
- Clorinde, a sister ship of Ariane

History

France
- Name: Ariane
- Namesake: Ariana
- Builder: Nantes
- Laid down: 1807
- Launched: 1811
- Commissioned: 9 January 1812
- Fate: Ran aground and scuttled 22 May 1812

General characteristics
- Class & type: Ariane-class frigate
- Length: 45.5 m (149 ft 3 in)
- Beam: 12.36 m (40 ft 7 in)
- Draught: 5.9 m (19 ft 4 in)
- Sail plan: Full-rigged ship, 1,950 m^{2} (21,000 sq ft)
- Complement: 325
- Armament: 46 guns: Battery: 28 × 18-pounder long guns; Quarterdeck and forecastle: 4 × 8-pounder long guns; 12 × 18-pounder carronades

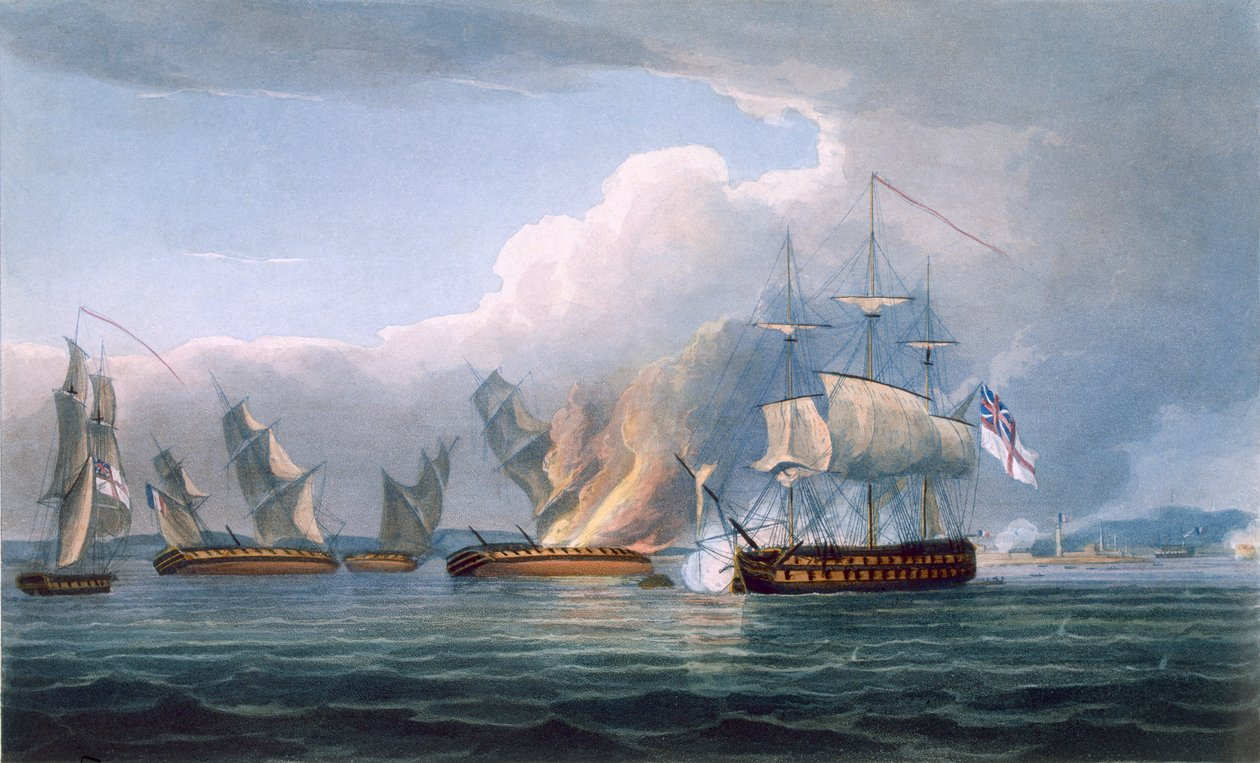
Ariane aground (second from left), Andromaque ablaze and sinking (second right), and HMS Northumberland (right) on 22 May 1812.

Ariane was a 40-gun frigate of the French Navy, lead ship of her class.

== Career ==
Ariane was commissioned on 9 January 1812 under Captain Jean-Baptiste-Henri Féretier.

Between 21 February 1812 and 17 May, a three-vessel French squadron consisting of the frigates Ariane and Andromaque, and the brig Mameluck engaged in commerce raiding in the Atlantic. They captured numerous British and American vessels and burnt them all, except for Patent, M'Master, master, and Woodrup, Sims, master. They made a cartel of Patent, putting their British prisoners aboard her; she arrived at Plymouth on 24 May. The American prisoners the French put on Woodrop, which they sent to the US.

Returning to Lorient, the squadron met the British 74-gun ship-of-the-line HMS Northumberland, Captain Henry Hotham. In the ensuing action of 22 May 1812, the two frigates ran aground trying to escape their much stronger opponent; their crews set them afire to prevent the frigates's capture.

== See also ==
- List of French sail frigates
