= Action of 22 May 1812 =

- Part of the Napoleonic Wars
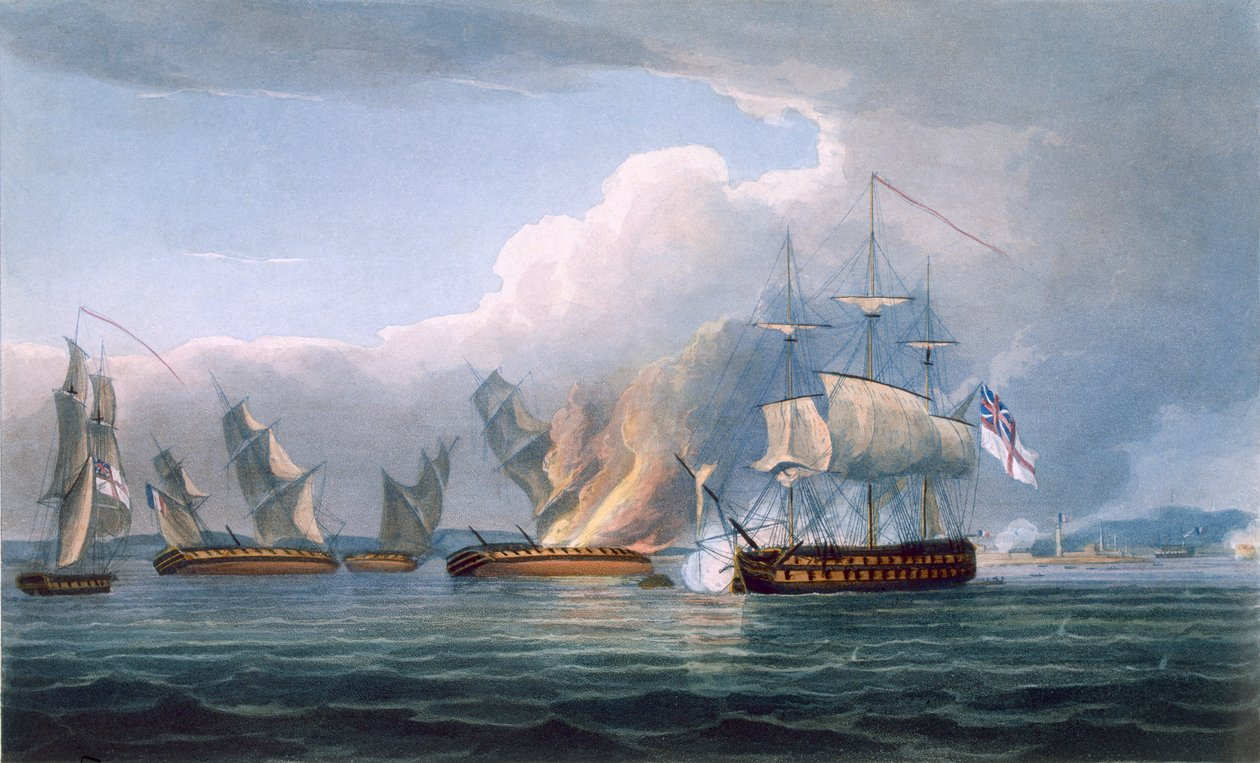
- Destruction of the French Frigates Arianne & Andromaque 22nd May 1812; Thomas Whitcombe, 1816
Date	22 May 1812
Location	Off Penmarch, Atlantic Ocean
Result	British victory

Belligerents
United Kingdom	France

Commanders and leaders
Henry Hotham; John Weeks	Jean Féretier; Nicolas Morice

Strength
1 ship of the line 1 brig	2 frigates 1 brig

Casualties and losses
33 killed and wounded	Unknown killed and wounded 2 frigates destroyed

The action of 22 May 1812 took place off Groix when a small French squadron comprising the French frigates Ariane and Andromaque, and the brig Mameluck returning from a commerce raiding campaign in the Atlantic, met the 74-gun HMS Northumberland while trying the slip to Lorient through the British blockade.

After a gunnery exchange that left all ships damaged, the frigates attempted to lose Northumberland by sailing through a shallow pass, but they ran aground. Northumberland, her repairs completed, returned to the scene and bombarded Andromaque until her rigging caught fire, setting the entire ship ablaze. Unable to refloat herself and trapped by Northumberland, Ariane's crew scuttled her by fire and evacuated on Mameluck.

Captains Jean-Baptiste-Henri Féretier and Nicolas Morice were found guilty of negligence in the loss of their ships, and forbidden from commanding for three years.

== Background ==
By 1812, the Royal Navy enjoyed an absolute supremacy on all seas, and even blockaded French harbours, preventing French squadrons from leaving and conducting naval operations of significance. The French Navy was thus forced into commerce raiding: small frigate squadrons (usually just a pair of frigates) would attempt to slip through the blockade and roam the seas, patrolling to capture lightly armed merchantmen. On 9 January 1812, a French frigate squadron left Nantes to attack British and American shipping in the Atlantic, off the Azores and Bermuda. The squadron comprised the two 18-pounder 40-gun frigates Ariane and Andromaque, under Captains Jean-Baptiste-Henri Féretier and Nicolas Morice respectively, and the 16-gun brig Mameluck, under Captain Galabert. Feretier was the commanding officer of the squadron.

In the early afternoon of 15 January, the French cruise met a British squadron comprising the 50-gun HMS Leopard and the 40-gun HMS Endymion, which mounted 24-pounders. In the face of overwhelming odds, the French fled and in the evening had successfully outrun their pursuers. The French squadron, free to continue on its mission. reached its patrolling area and started preying on merchant shipping. In the course of four next months, it took 36 prizes (9 British, 3 Portuguese, 1 Spanish, 1 Swedish and 11 American), and made 217 prisoners. The British, however, were now informed of the presence of a French frigate squadron, and warned the blockade of Brest, under Rear-admiral Sir Harry Neale, to watch for its return. Neale sent Northumberland, under Captain the Honourable Henry Hotham, to attempt to intercept the frigates and bring them into action. Northumberland detached on 19 May and took position off the point of Isle Groix. Meanwhile, the French squadron was on its course back to France. Through prisoners and logs of captured ships, Feretier had learned of Allemand's escape from Lorient to Brest; he thus expected the British blockading ships to be sailing in pursuit of the French fleet or cruising off Brest, and attempted to seize the opportunity to slip through to Lorient.

== Action ==
In the morning of 22 May, the French squadron arrived off the Roches de Penmarch. Around 11:30, a large sail appeared in the north, which was soon recognised to be the Northumberland . Feretier decided to sail through by force. (Note: Troude reports that Feretier's intention was to temporally renounce returning to Lorient and tack to outrun the British ship of the line. The reports of Feretier and Morice state that his intention was to confront Northumberland and force the passage.) However, Morice signaled that one of his crew, Ensign Legrand, was familiar with the area and thought himself capable of leading the frigates through a shallow pass where they could evade Northumberland. (Note: In 1805, the Vétéran had escaped a British fleet with a similar tactic, slipping through a narrow passage into Concarneau, deemed too shallow for ships of the line.) Feretier decided to take his chance with this idea, and ordered Andromaque to lead, leaving Mameluck free to manoeuver at will. Around 15:00, the frigates came within range of Northumberland, which waited near Pointe du Talut. Northumberland fired a few shots, to which Andromaque, supported by coastal defence batteries, responded with her whole broadside. A full artillery exchange broke out, obscuring the view of the ships with smoke and killing Ensign Legrand on Andromaque. Officer Legros, the only other officer on Andromaque familiar with these waters, took over the pilotage, but around 17:45, Andromaque ran aground on the northern part of Basse Grasie reef. Ariane reacted by turning on her right, but soon also ran aground. Sensing the danger, Northumberland immediately retreated, and took the opportunity to repair the damage caused to her rigging by the cannonade, particularly her fore topmast.

With Mameluck the only ship able to manoeuver, Feretier ordered the brig to sail to Lorient and request assistance. Mameluck attempted to execute the order, but also ran aground, close to Ariane. With the receding tide, the frigates started to list so much that they threw their starboard artillery overboard, emptied their water reserves and removed all unnecessary cargo. Soon afterwards, Northumberland, returned, along with the 12-gun Growler, anchored north of the frigates, and started a two-hour bombardment, to which the frigates were unable to respond, save for a handful of carronades on Andromaque. After the first few shots, at 5:55, a fire broke out in the fore top of Andromaque; with his fire pump shattered, Morice ordered the mast cut down, but all the men assigned to the task were killed or wounded by British shots, and fire soon engulfed the forecastle. With the water intake well above the sea, it was impossible to flood the powder room. Feretier sent an ensign to Andromaque, who returned to bring the news that the fire was beyond control; he then ordered the 86 sick and the prisoners taken to the boats that had come from Lorient. Northumberland, upon seeing they had been successful in their aims, departed from the action. The préfet maritime went to the site of the battle. Feretier reported that the hull of Ariane was riddled with shot to starboard and filled with water, and that the pilots deemed her impossible to refloat. The préfet then ordered Ariane abandoned; Feretier had her set afire to prevent her capture. By 8:20, the crew had come ashore and the officers embarked on boats for Lorient; Andromaque exploded soon afterwards. Ariane exploded in the night, at 2:30. Mameluck had cut her topmasts and thrown her artillery overboard in fruitless attempts to refloat, and had been abandoned by her crew because a number of the shots below the waterline made her impossible to sail into combat. However, she had not suffered as much as the frigates, and the next day, a party returned to Mameluck and succeeded in refloating her. (Note: James (op. cit., p.51) reports a third explosion after those of Andromaque and Ariane, which he erroneously attributes toMameluck meeting the same fate.) She reached Lorient on 24, only survivor of the squadron.

== Aftermath ==
The frigates, loaded with the most valuable items captured on their prizes, were particularly low in the water, which contributed to their grounding; moreover, the pass that Legrand, a native of Ploemeur, recalled, could only be used by boats, and would never have accommodated a frigate. James remarks that the grounding of the smaller Mameluck is a testimony of the hopelessness of the attempt to sail a frigate through the pass. Feretier and Morice were court-martialled, as was customary for the loss of a ship. Captain Le Gouardun blamed them for not having diverted to Brest, Cherbourg or Saint Malo, or even returned to Lorient after a feint to lose the British ship; he furthermore remarked that the frigate squadron could fight the 74-gun only in a melee, and not by forming a line of battle; he suggested that Feretier could have lacked bravery in following Morice's Andromaque and leaving her to sustain the brunt of the fight, and that this line was also a navigation error, as it sent Ariane onto the same rocks as Andromaque. Both captains were declared guilty of incompetence, stripped of rank and forbidden from commanding a ship for three years. However, as the Navy suffered from a lack of personnel, they were quickly appointed as first officers on other ships.

James mentions that a "fine French two-decker, with sails bent and topgallant yards across, in the harbour of Lorient, lay a mortified spectator of this gallant achievement"; the ship in question was the 80-gun Diadème, that could not intervene due to the unfavourable winds. On the British side, Lieutenant Weeks, captain of Growler, and Lieutenant John Banks, first officer of Northumberland, were promoted to Commander for their roles in the battle. In 1986, Jean-Claude Abadie discovered the traces of one of the wrecked frigates at the site of Grasu, off Lorient-Ploemeur. The DRASSM (Département des Recherches Archéologiques Subaquatiques et Sous-marines, Ministry of Culture) confirmed the site. Another wreck was found nearby, although it turned out to be that of a merchantman, of the same era but unrelated to the event. A bronze cannon was found by an amateur diver shortly thereafter. In 1996, an underwater excavation was undertaken to salvage remains of the wreck, with 54 divers searching the area between 1 and 10 metres deep. Another excavation in June 2000 located the second frigate. The fruits of the search were put on display at the Cité de la Mer.

== Notes, citations, and references ==
=== References ===
- Troude, Onésime-Joachim (1867). Batailles navales de la France. Vol. 4. Challamel ainé. pp. 160–162.
- James, William (2002) [1827]. The Naval History of Great Britain, Volume 1, 1793–1796. London: Conway Maritime Press. ISBN 0-85177-905-0. OCLC 165702223.
