= Nicolas Morice =

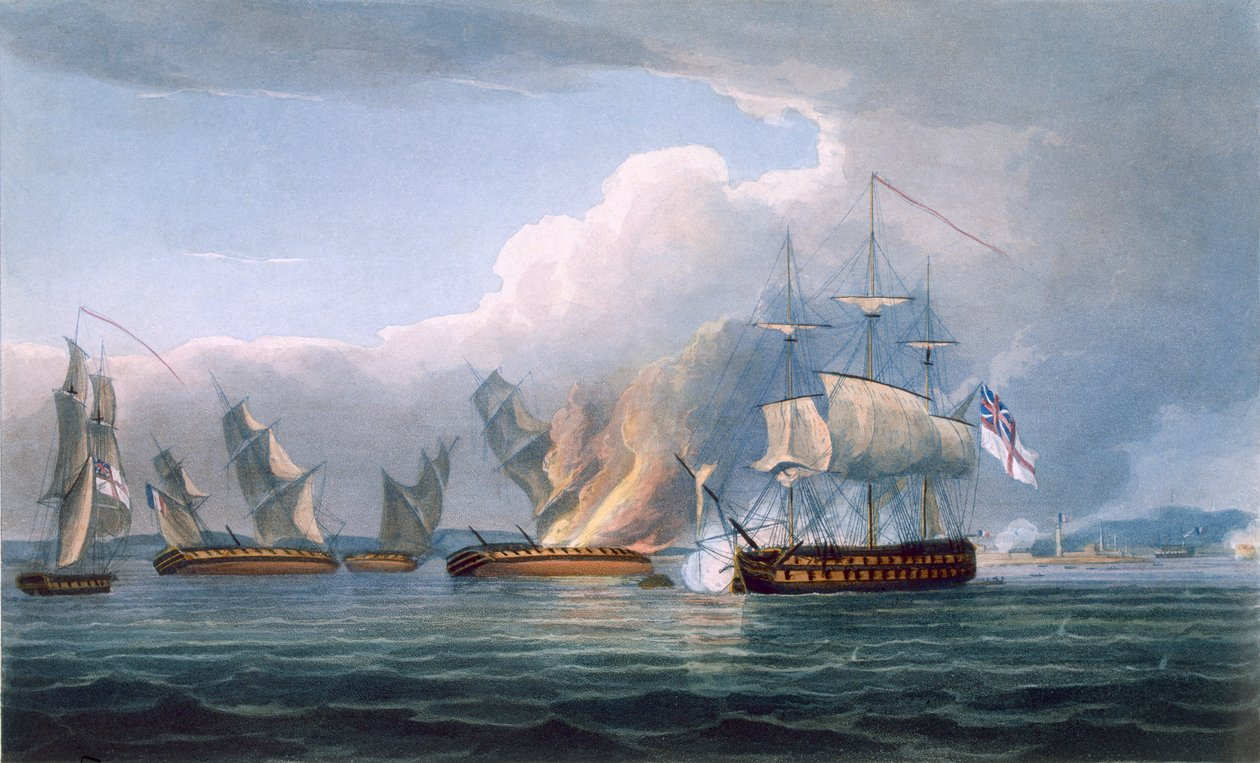
The action of 22 May 1812, which Morice fought in

Captain Nicolas Morice (born c. 1774) was a French Navy officer. He was born in Lorient.

== Career ==
Nicolas Morice became an ensign in 1796 and rose to lieutenant in 1803. Morice took part in the Battle of Grand Port, where he captained the corvette Victor.

In 1810 he was promoted to commander. He took command of the frigate Andromaque, part of a squadron raiding British commerce in the Atlantic, along with the Ariane, under Jean-Baptiste-Henri Féretier. Andromaque was destroyed upon her return to Lorient after catching fire during an artillery duel with the 74-gun HMS Northumberland in the action of 22 May 1812. Feretier and Morice were court-martialed for the loss of their ships, stripped of their rank, and forbidden from commanding a ship for three years. They were, however, quickly reintegrated into the French navy.

Morice was promoted to captain first class in 1827.

== Honours ==
- Legion of Honour
- Order of Saint Louis in 1814.

== Sources and references ==
- Sources : AN – BB4 – 353
- Roche, Jean-Michel (2005). Dictionnaire des bâtiments de la flotte de guerre française de Colbert à nos jours, 1671 - 1870. Group Retozel-Maury Millau. p. 99. ISBN 978-2-9525917-0-6. OCLC 165892922.
