= French ship Golymin (1809) =

Ship of the line of the French Navy

- Scale model of Achille, sister ship of French ship Golymin (1809), on display at the Musée national de la Marine in Paris.

History

France
- Name: Golymin
- Namesake: Battle of Golymin
- Ordered: 4 June 1804, as Inflexible
- Builder: Caudan, Lorient
- Laid down: 4 June 1804
- Launched: 8 December 1809
- In service: 1 January 1812
- Fate: Wrecked on Mengam Rock on 23 March 1814

General characteristics
- Class & type: Téméraire-class ship of the line
- Displacement: 3,069 tonneaux
- Tons burthen: 1,537 port tonneaux
- Length: 55.87 m (183 ft 4 in)
- Beam: 14.46 m (47 ft 5 in)
- Draught: 7.15 m (23.5 ft)
- Depth of hold: 7.15 m (23 ft 5 in)
- Sail plan: Full-rigged ship
- Crew: 705
- Armament: 74 guns: Lower gun deck: 28 × 36 pdr guns; Upper gun deck: 30 × 18 pdr guns; Forecastle and Quarterdeck: 16 × 8 pdr guns

The Golymin was a 74-gun Téméraire-class ship of the line built for the French Navy during the first decade of the 19th century. Completed in 1808, she played a minor role in the Napoleonic Wars.

== Description ==
Designed by Jacques-Noël Sané, the Téméraire-class ships had a length of 55.87 metres (183 ft 4 in), a beam of 14.46 metres (47 ft 5 in) and a depth of hold of 7.15 metres (23 ft 5 in). The ships displaced 3,069 tonneaux and had a mean draught of 7.15 metres (23 ft 5 in). They had a tonnage of 1,537 port tonneaux. Their crew numbered 705 officers and ratings during wartime. They were fitted with three masts and ship rigged.

The muzzle-loading, smoothbore armament of the Téméraire class consisted of twenty-eight 36-pounder long guns on the lower gun deck and thirty 18-pounder long guns on the upper gun deck. On the quarterdeck and forecastle were a total of sixteen 8-pounder long guns. Beginning with the ships completed after 1787, the armament of the Téméraires began to change with the addition of four 36-pounder obusiers on the poop deck (dunette). Some ships had instead twenty 8-pounders.

== Construction and career ==
Golymin was ordered on 11 November 1804 and named Inflexible on 26 February 1805. The ship was reordered on 26 March and laid down in June at the Arsenal de Lorient. She was renamed Golymin on 23 February 1807 and launched on 8 December 1809. The ship was commissioned under Captain Amand Leduc on 1 January 1812, taking part in Allemand's escape from Lorient in March. On 23 March 1814, Golymin was despatched from Brest to assist two frigates inbound for the harbour, but a gust of wind pushed her onto a rock in the Goulet de Brest. where she was wrecked and sank. The crew managed to abandon ship in good order and was ferried ashore by boats without loss of life. Leduc was court-martialled and found innocent of the loss of the ship on 15 July 1814.

The wreck was discovered in 1977 by Michèle and Jean-Marie Retornaz, and explored by the DRASSM in 1980. Golymin is the source of the obusier de vaisseau currently on display in the Musée national de la Marine in Paris and in Brest.

Obusiers de vaisseau found of the wreck of Golymin
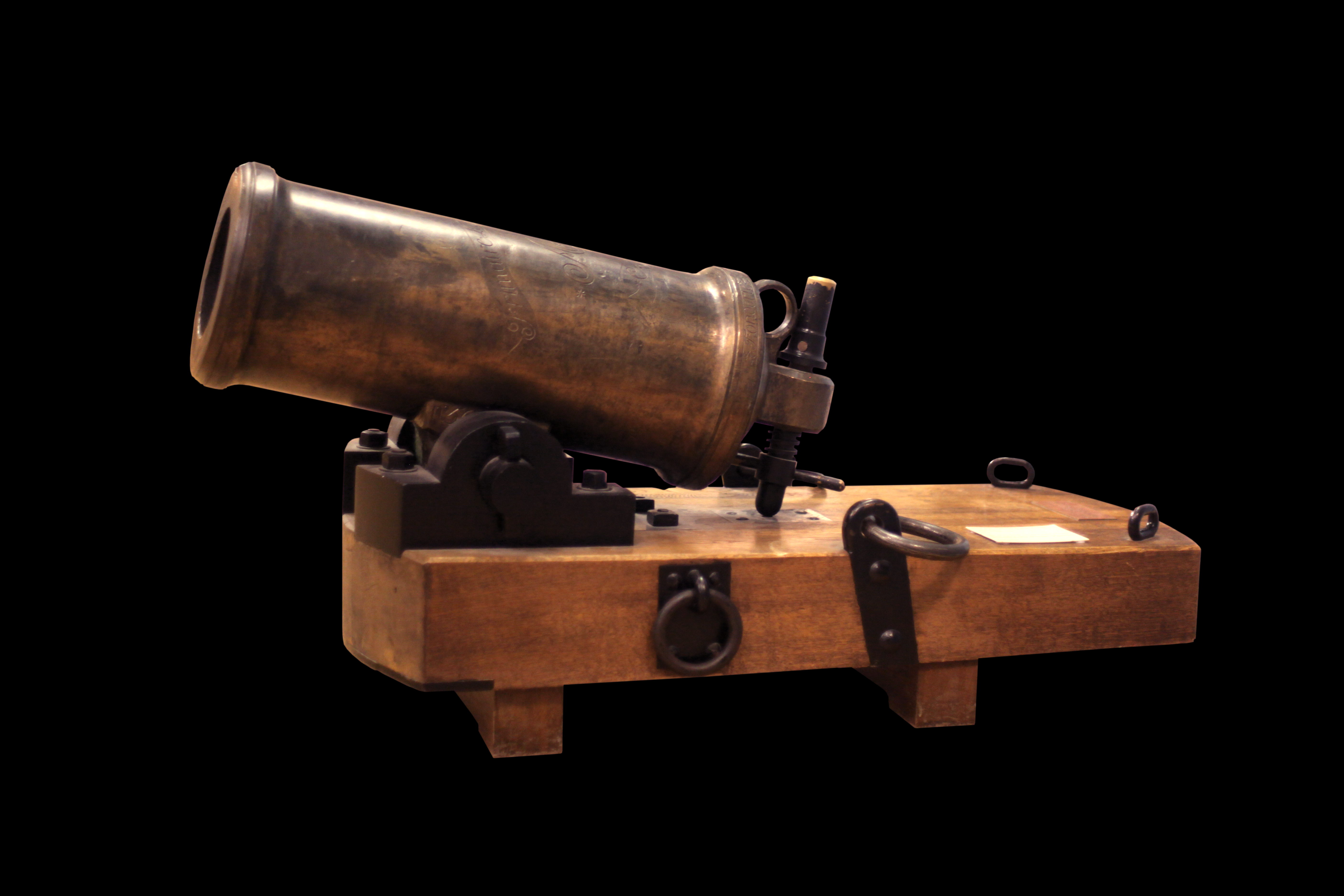
On display at the Musée national de la Marine in Paris

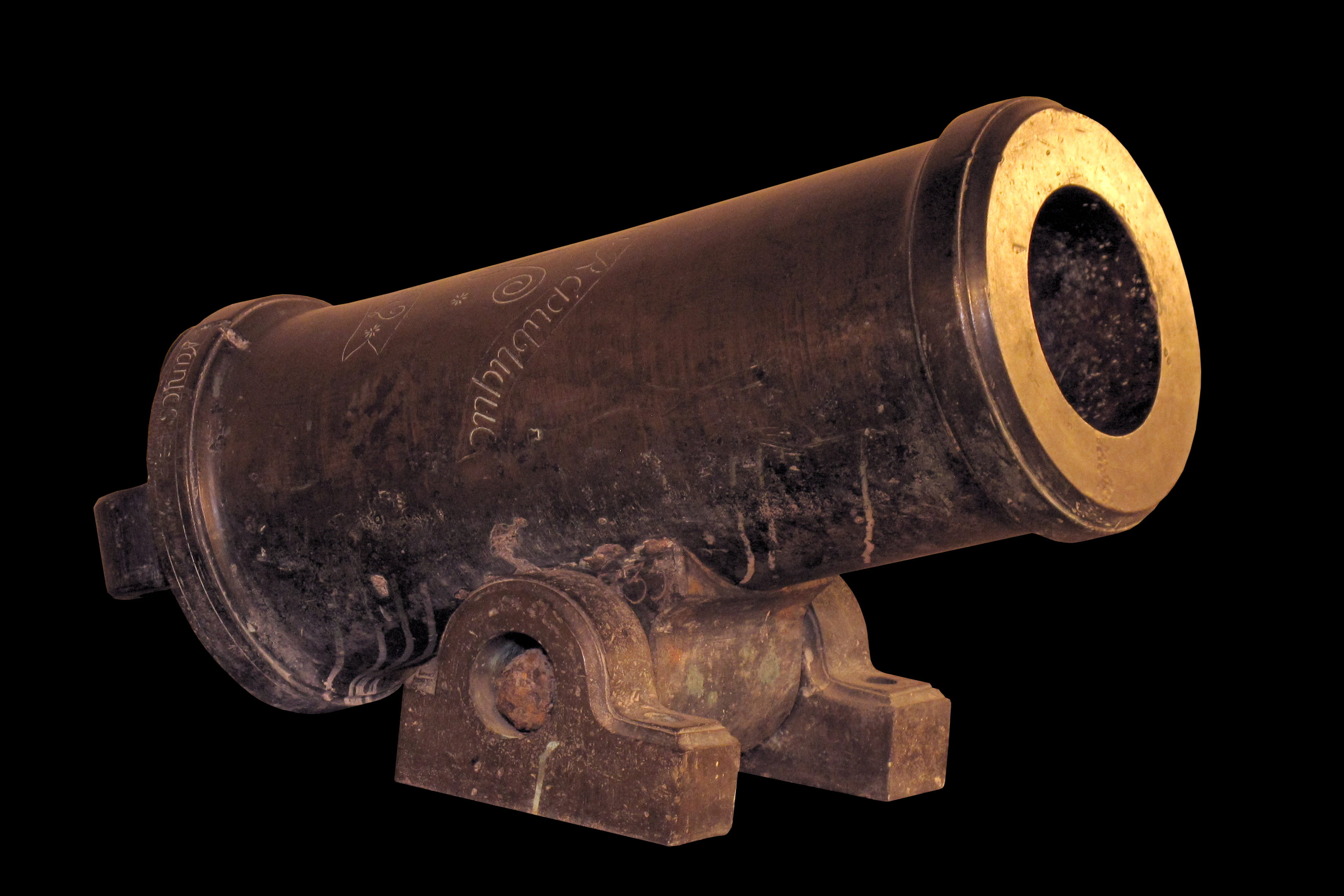
On display at the Musée national de la Marine in Brest

== Citations ==
=== Bibliography ===
- Roche, Jean-Michel (2005). Dictionnaire des bâtiments de la flotte de guerre française de Colbert à nos jours [Dictionary of French Warships from Colbert to Today]. Vol. 1: 1671-1870. Roche. ISBN 978-2-9525917-0-6. OCLC 165892922.
- Quintin, Danielle; Quintin, Bernard (2003). Dictionnaire des capitaines de Vaisseau de Napoléon (in French). S.P.M. ISBN 2-901952-42-9.
- Troude, Onésime-Joachim (1867). Batailles navales de la France (in French). Vol. 4. Challamel ainé.
- Winfield, Rif and Roberts, Stephen S. (2015) French Warships in the Age of Sail 1786-1861: Design, Construction, Careers and Fates. Seaforth Publishing. ISBN 978-1-84832-204-2
