= Henry Hotham =

British Royal Navy officer (1777–1833)

Vice-Admiral The Honourable Sir Henry Hotham GCMG KCB
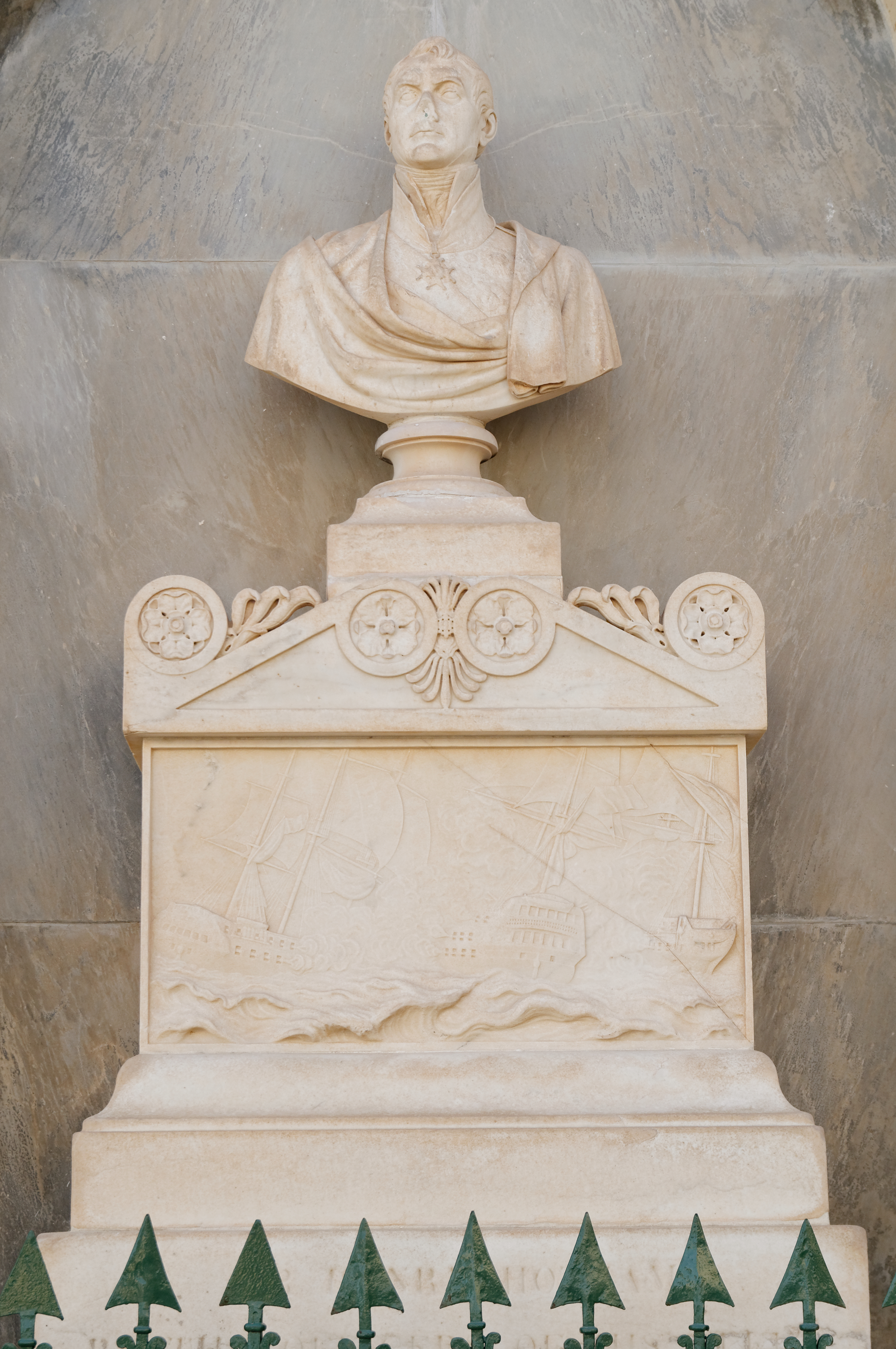
- Monument to Sir Henry Hotham in Upper Barrakka Gardens, Valletta
- Born: 19 February 1777
- Died: 19 April 1833 (aged 56); Valletta, Malta
- Relatives: Admiral William Hotham (uncle); Admiral Sir William Hotham (cousin); General Beaumont Hotham, 3rd Baron Hotham (nephew)
- Military career
- Allegiance: Great Britain; United Kingdom
- Branch: Royal Navy
- Service years: 1790–1833
- Rank: Vice-Admiral
- Commands: Fleche; HMS Mignonne; HMS Dido; HMS Blanche; HMS Immortalite; HMS Imperieuse; HMS Revolutionnaire; HMS Defiance; HMS Northumberland; HMS Superb; Mediterranean Fleet
- Conflicts: French Revolutionary Wars; Siege of Bastia; Napoleonic Wars; Battle of Cape Ortegal; Battle of Les Sables-d'Olonne; Action of 22 May 1812; Hundred Days; War of 1812
- Awards: Order of the Bath (1815); Order of St Michael and St George (1831)

Vice-Admiral Sir Henry Hotham GCMG KCB (19 February 1777 – 19 April 1833) was a Royal Navy officer who served in the French Revolutionary and Napoleonic Wars and War of 1812. He was later a member of the Board of Admiralty, and ended his career as Commander-in-Chief of the Mediterranean Fleet.

== Biography ==
=== French Revolutionary Wars ===
Henry Hotham was the youngest surviving son of Beaumont Hotham (2nd Baron Hotham from 1813) and Susanna, daughter of Sir Thomas Hankey. He joined the Navy in 1790 (aged 13) serving aboard Princess Royal, the flagship of his uncle Rear-Admiral William Hotham. He went on to serve aboard Lizard, Lapwing, Victory and Aigle, and finally once again with his uncle, now a Vice-Admiral, aboard Britannia in the Mediterranean.

Hotham was present as a midshipman at the Siege of Bastia in April–May 1794. He was subsequently commissioned as a lieutenant on 6 June 1794 (aged just 17) and was given command of the prize sloop Fleche in November 1794. He was promoted to captain on 13 January 1795, in the prize frigate Mignonne, and later commanded the sixth-rate Dido and the fifth-rate Blanche.

Hotham was in command of Blanche on 5 February 1797 when she and Inconstant, Captain Thomas Fremantle, captured the ship Fortune of Philadelphia. On 20 November 1797 he captured the French privateer brig Le Coureur, of 14 guns and 90 men, after a three-hour chase. On 27 December 1797, about 170 nmi (310 km; 200 mi) west of Porto, he captured the Bayonnois, a French privateer brig of six guns and 40 men, after a 16-hour chase. The brig had sailed from Bayonne 31 days previously and had made no captures.

Blanche was paid off in August 1798, and Hotham was appointed to the frigate Immortalité in early 1800. He operated in the Bay of Biscay, taking several prizes. Late on the evening of 12 September 1800 he captured a small Spanish vessel laden with stone, but while boarding her observed two French privateer ships, Brave and Bellone coming out of the Gironde. He was obliged to scuttle the Spaniard to make chase. The French attempted to evade him during the night, but Hotham anticipated their movements, and was still following the next day. Unfortunately he lost them the second night, having pursued them for 259 miles. However, on 20 September, he recaptured the English ship Monarch, of 645 tons, laden with timber, which had been taken by Bellone four days earlier. On 22 September, off Cordouan Lighthouse, he chased a French brig, and by 9.30 p.m., had come within musket-shot, when both vessels unexpectedly grounded near Noirmoutier. The brig was wrecked; but Immortalite refloated herself the next morning, suffering nothing more serious than the loss of an anchor, cable, and boat. On the morning of the next day, the 24th, he spotted the French letter of marque schooner Constance, carrying a cargo of coffee and sugar from Guadaloupe to Bordeaux, but the privateer lugger Cynthia from Guernsey, captured her before he could intervene. On 26 October 1800 Immortalite, in company with Thames and Beaulieu, captured the French privateer Diable à Quatre, of 16 guns and 150 men, and on the 29th a letter of marque schooner, sailing from Guadaloupe to Bourdeaux, with a cargo of coffee. Hotham was also present in Immortalite at the capture of the Dédaigneuse on 27 January 1801. He then, on 14 April 1801, captured the French privateer brig Laure, of 14 guns and 78 men. She was 15 days out of St. Malo, and had captured a Portuguese vessel sailing Bristol to Lisbon, and had made 17 other captures in previous cruises. On 27 July, assisted by the presence of the frigate Arethusa, he captured the Invention, an unusual privateer designed and commanded by M. Thibaut. She was 147 feet (45 m) long, but only 27 feet (8.2 m) wide, with four masts, and carried 24 guns on a flush deck, and a crew of 210. She had sailed from Bordeaux nine days before on her first cruise. Towards the close of the war in 1802, the Immortalite was blockading the port of Brest.

=== Napoleonic Wars ===
Soon after the renewal of hostilities in May 1803, Hotham obtained command of the 40-gun frigate Imperieuse, and in the same year he recaptured a South Sea whaler, homeward bound in the Channel.

He was appointed to the frigate Revolutionnaire in April 1804, conveying Prince Augustus Frederick, Duke of Sussex from Lisbon to Portsmouth in August. In September he escorted an outward bound East India fleet, before proceeding to Halifax. On 1 December 1803 Imperieuse recaptured the ship Britannia, and on 4 November 1805 he assisted at the capture of four French ships by Sir Richard Strachan in the Battle of Cape Ortegal.

In March 1806 Hotham took command of the 74-gun Defiance, in the squadron of Rear-Admiral Robert Stopford. On 23 February 1809 Stopford's squadron fought three French frigates in the Battle of Les Sables-d'Olonne. The three French ships were anchored off the port under the protection of coastal batteries, but Defiance, Caesar and Donegal closed in, and fired on the French ships until forced to withdraw by the ebbing of the tide, damaging them to the extent the one was subsequently broken up, and the other two declared unfit for naval service and sold. Defiance was much cut up and had two men killed and 25 wounded. In 1807, Hotham was employed on the coast of Spain, co-operating with Spanish forces. On 24 June, shortly after the French withdrawal from the north-western ports of Ferrol and Corunna, Hotham landed a detachment of seamen and marines to destroy various batteries commanding the bay, and also captured the castle of San Felipe, still under the command of French sympathizers. On 23 December 1809 Defiance recaptured the ship Ellison from the French. On 1 June 1810 he captured the French chasse-marées Syrene, Eugene, and St. Yves.

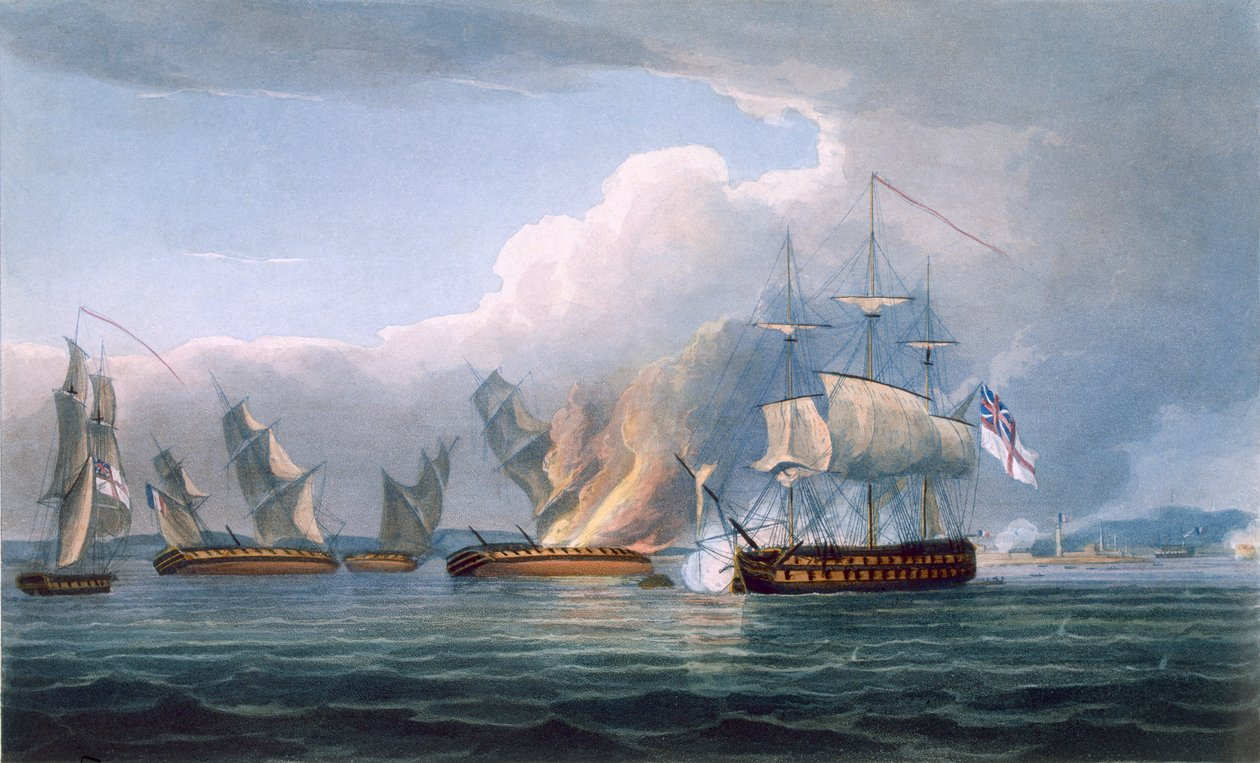
Destruction of the French Frigates Arianne & Andromaque 22nd May 1812, From left to right: Mameluck, Ariane, Andromaque (on fire) and Northumberland

Hotham then took command of the ship Northumberland. On 5 November 1810 he recaptured the Zodiac, and on the 9th captured the Venus. On 22 November 1810, he captured the French privateer ketch Glaneuse, of 14 guns and 85 men, after a two-day pursuit, after preventing her from capturing a British packet ship. On 4 April 1811 he destroyed two chasse-marées, but not before removing 63 casks of wine from them. In 1812 Hotham was serving under Rear-Admiral Sir Harry Neale off Ushant, and was sent by him to cruise off l'Orient, to intercept three expected French vessels. In the ensuing action on 22 May Northumberland, assisted by the gun-brig Growler, encountered the French frigates Ariane and Andromaque, both of 44 guns and 450 men, and the brig Mameluke, of 18 guns and 150 men, near the island of Groix. Hotham skilfully manoeuvred his ship so as to force the enemy to ground themselves. Northumberland then opened a steady fire at point-blank range until the ships were abandoned and burning.

=== War of 1812 ===
In December 1812 Hotham was appointed Captain of the Fleet to Admiral Sir John Borlase Warren on the North American Station. On 4 December 1813, he was promoted to rear-admiral, and nominated a Colonel of Marines. From 4 June 1814 he served under Vice-Admiral Sir Alexander Cochrane. On 17 December 1814, he submitted to the Admiralty a list of 82 American vessels captured, burnt, and destroyed by his squadron between 6 August and 9 October 1814. This does not include the frigate USS President, captured by four ships of his squadron on 15 January 1815.

Hotham was made a Knight Commander of the Most Honourable Military Order of the Bath on 2 January 1815, having his investiture on 12 April.

=== The Hundred Days ===
On the renewal of the war in Europe, following Napoleon's return from Elba in March 1815, Hotham commanded a division of the Channel Fleet, flying his flag in Superb. In July 1815 Hotham was stationed in Quiberon Bay, from where he sent Captain Frederick Maitland in Bellerophon to blockade the port of Rochefort. Reinforced by Myrmidon and Slaney, Maitland prevented Napoleon from fleeing to the United States, and took him to England, from where he was sent to his final exile in Saint Helena.

=== Post-war career ===
On 25 March 1818 Hotham was appointed a member of the Board of Admiralty, his position being renewed in March 1819 and February 1822, serving until March 1822. On 28 May 1825 he was promoted to vice-admiral, and returned to serve on the Board of Admiralty in September 1828, renewed in June 1829 and July 1830, until November 1830. He was appointed Commander-in-Chief in the Mediterranean on 30 March 1831, and on 4 July 1831 was made a Knight Grand Cross of the Order of St Michael and St George.

One of Hotham's more notable acts as Commander-in-Chief was claiming a new territory for Britain. In July 1831 Commander Charles Henry Swinburne of Rapid reported a volcanic eruption and a column of vapour rising from the sea, some 26 miles off Sciacca, Sicily. Within a month it had grown into a roughly circular island of black volcanic sand about 3 miles (4.8 km) in circumference, and 74 feet (23 m) above sea level at its highest point. Hotham, in his flagship St Vincent, sailed to the new island and on 1 August sent his flag-captain Humphrey Fleming Senhouse ashore with a landing party to raise the Union Flag, and claim the island for Britain under the name "Graham Island", after the First Lord of the Admiralty, Sir James Graham. Later the Sicilians also landed, hoisted a flag, and claimed the island under the name "Ferdinandea", after King Ferdinand II of the Two Sicilies. The French made a claim to the island under the name "Julia", as did the Spanish. Diplomatic arguments continued until December 1831, by which time the island had been washed away leaving only a seamount 26 feet (7.9 m) below the waves.

Hotham died suddenly of an intracranial hemorrhage in Valletta, Malta, on 19 April 1833, and was buried at Msida Bastion Cemetery in Floriana on 24 April.

== Personal life ==
On 6 July 1816 Hotham married Lady Frances Anne Juliana Rous, the only child of John Rous, 1st Earl of Stradbroke, and his first wife Frances Juliana Warter-Wilson. They had three sons:

- Reverend Henry John Hotham (1822–1885), Fellow of Trinity College, Cambridge
- Reverend Frederick Harry Hotham (1824–1887), Rector of Rushbury, Shrewsbury
- Captain Beaumont Williams Hotham (1825–1915), HM Consul at Calais 1859–1882

== See also ==
- Baron Hotham
- South Dalton

Military offices
Preceded by Sir Pulteney Malcolm	Commander-in-Chief, Mediterranean Fleet; 1831–1833	Succeeded by Sir Pulteney Malcolm
