= French ship Vétéran (1803) =

Ship of the line of the French Navy

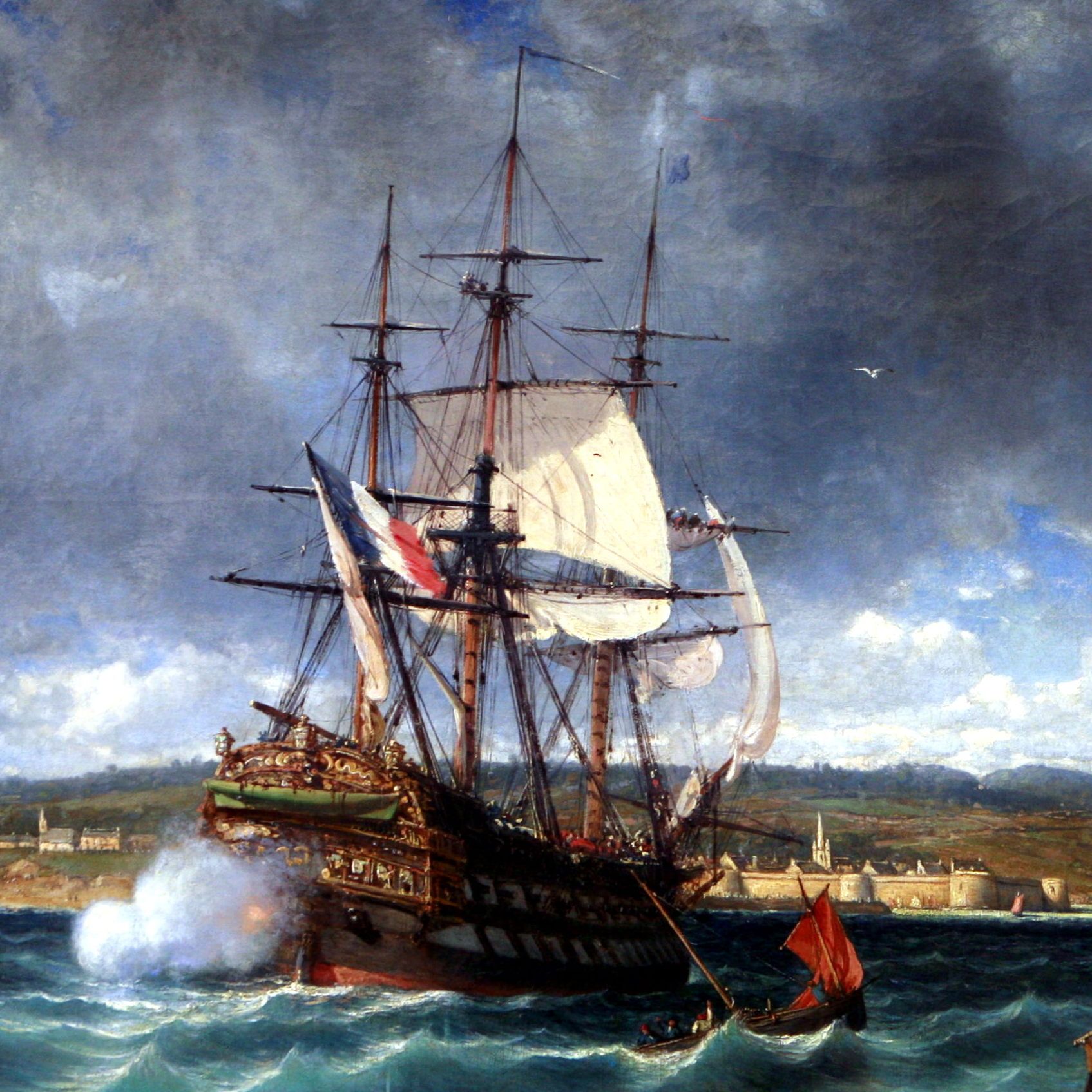
- Vétéran escaping into the shallow waters of Concarneau harbour. Painting by Michel Bouquet, on display at Brest Fine arts museum.

History

France
- Name: Vétéran
- Namesake: Veteran
- Builder: Brest
- Laid down: 10 November 1794
- Launched: 18 July 1803
- In service: December 1803
- Out of service: 26 October 1833
- Fate: Broken up 1842

General characteristics (as built)
- Class & type: Lengthened Téméraire-class ship of the line
- Displacement: 3,200 tonneaux
- Tons burthen: 1,600 port tonneaux
- Length: 56.47 m (185 ft 3 in)
- Beam: 14.73 m (48 ft 4 in)
- Draught: 7.47 m (24.5 ft)
- Depth of hold: 7.23 m (23 ft 9 in)
- Sail plan: Full-rigged ship
- Crew: 735
- Armament: 74 guns: Lower gun deck: 28 × 36 pdr guns; Upper gun deck: 30 × 24 pdr guns; Forecastle and Quarterdeck: 16 × 8 pdr guns; Poop deck: 4 × 36 pdr obusiers

The Vétéran was a 74-gun lengthened Téméraire-class ship of the line built for the French Navy during the 1790s, designed by Jacques-Noël Sané. Completed in 1803, she played a minor role in the Napoleonic Wars.

== Description ==
Vétéran and her sister ship Cassard were enlarged to carry an upper deck battery of 24-pounder long guns instead of the 18-pounders used on the standard ships of the Téméraire class. The two lengthened Téméraire-class ships had a length of 56.47 metres (185 ft 3 in), a beam of 14.73 metres (48 ft 4 in) and a depth of hold of 7.23 metres (23 ft 9 in). The ships displaced 3,200 tonneaux and had a mean draught of 7.47 metres (24 ft 6 in). They had a tonnage of 1,600 port tonneaux. Their crew numbered 735 officers and ratings during wartime. They were fitted with three masts and ship rigged.

The muzzle-loading, smoothbore armament of the Téméraire class consisted of twenty-eight 36-pounder long guns on the lower gun deck and thirty 24-pounder long guns on the upper gun deck. The armament on the quarterdeck and forecastle consisted of a total of sixteen 8-pounder long guns. On the poop deck (dunette) were four 36-pounder obusiers. The 24-pounders were satisfactory, but the ships nevertheless reverted to their previous 18-pounders around 1806. At the same time the obusiers were removed and the armament of the forecastle and quarterdeck revised to consist of a total of fourteen 8-pounders and fourteen 36-pounder carronades.

== Construction and career ==
Vétéran was ordered on 19 June 1794 and named Magnanime in October. The ship was laid down on 10 October at the Arsenal de Brest and was renamed Quatorze Juillet on 7 May 1798. She was then renamed Vétéran on 6 December 1802 and launched on 18 July 1803. The ship was commissioned on 24 September and completed in December. On 13 December 1805, she departed Brest under captain Jérôme Bonaparte, as part of Willaumez division, to participate in what became the Atlantic campaign of 1806. The 1806 Great Coastal hurricane scattered the division and Vétéran found herself isolated. She cruised off Quebec, destroying merchantmen and skirmishing with Royal Navy forces. She eventually returned to France and evaded the British blockade, entering Concarneau thanks to the experience of a sailor who had been a fisherman in the region. However, she ended up trapped, unable to leave the harbour for years. At some point before 1812 she fled to Lorient. In 1812, she took part in Allemand's escape from Lorient. She then sailed to Brest under Captain Jurien de Lagravière. She was decommissioned in 1833, and broken up in 1842.

== Sources and references ==
- Roche, Jean-Michel (2005). Dictionnaire des bâtiments de la flotte de guerre française de Colbert à nos jours [Dictionary of French Warships from Colbert to Today]. Vol. 1: 1671-1870. Roche. ISBN 978-2-9525917-0-6. OCLC 165892922.
- Winfield, Rif and Roberts, Stephen S. (2015) French Warships in the Age of Sail 1786-1861: Design, Construction, Careers and Fates. Seaforth Publishing. ISBN 978-1-84832-204-2
