= HMS Northumberland (1798) =

Ship of the line of the Royal Navy

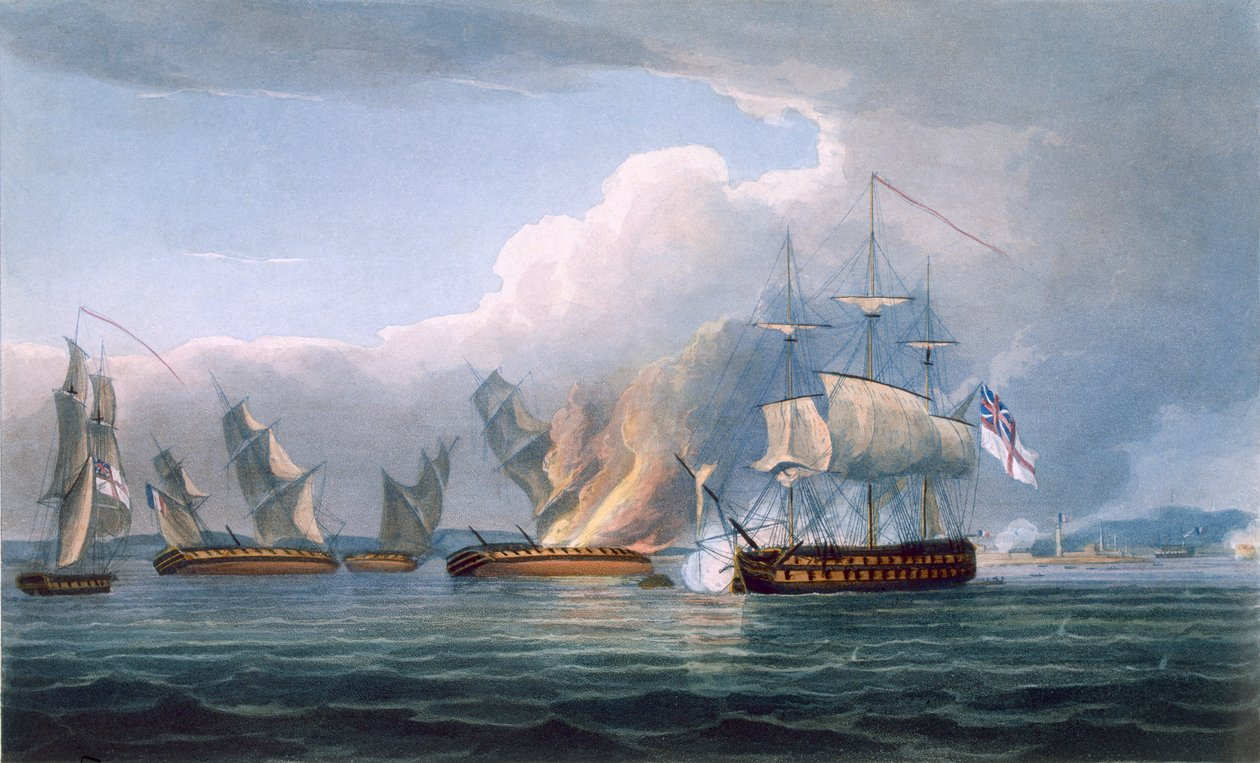
- Destruction of the French Frigates Arianne & Andromaque 22nd May 1812. The image shows the last stages of the action of 22 May 1812. From left to right: Mameluck, Ariane, Andromaque and Northumberland.

History

Great Britain
- Name: Northumberland
- Ordered: 10 June 1795
- Builder: Barnard, Deptford
- Laid down: October 1795
- Launched: 2 February 1798
- Honours and awards: Participated in Battle of San Domingo; Naval General Service Medal with clasp "Egypt"
- Fate: Broken up, 1850
- Notes: Hulked, February 1827

General characteristics
- Class & type: America-class ship of the line
- Tons burthen: 1907 (bm)
- Length: 182 ft (55 m) (gundeck)
- Beam: 48 ft 7 1/2 in (14.821 m)
- Depth of hold: 21 ft 7 in (6.58 m)
- Propulsion: Sails
- Sail plan: Full-rigged ship
- Armament: Gundeck: 28 × 32-pounder guns; Upper gundeck: 30 × 18-pounder guns; QD: 12 × 9-pounder guns; Fc: 4 × 9-pounder guns

HMS Northumberland was a 74-gun third-rate ship of the line of the Royal Navy, built at the yards of Barnard, Deptford, and launched on 2 February 1798. She carried Napoleon to his final exile on St Helena.

== Service history ==
Northumberland, Alexander, Penelope, Bonne Citoyenne, and the brig Vincejo shared in the proceeds of the French polacca Vengeance, captured entering Valletta, Malta on 6 April 1800.

On 8 January 1801, Penelope captured the French bombard St. Roche, which was carrying wine, liqueurs, ironware, Delfth cloth, and various other merchandise, from Marseille to Alexandria. Swiftsure, Tigre, Minotaur, Northumberland, Florentina, and the schooner Malta, were in sight and shared in the proceeds of the capture.

As Northumberland had served in the navy's Egyptian campaign (8 March to 8 September 1801), her officers and crew qualified for the clasp "Egypt" to the Naval General Service Medal that the Admiralty authorized in 1850 to all surviving claimants. (Note: A first-class share of the prize money awarded in April 1823 was worth £34 2s 4d; a fifth-class share, that of a seaman, was worth 3s 11½d. The amount was small as the total had to be shared between 79 vessels and the entire army contingent.)

On 6 December 1801, she arrived off Tunis under the command of Capt. Martin.

In August Northumberland detained and sent into Plymouth Comet, a vessel that the French had captured on 1 July 1803 as Comet was sailing from England to Bengal under charter to the British East India Company. An American house with an office in London had purchased Comet at A Coruña as a prize and was sending her to London when Northumberland intercepted her.

Northumberland participated in the Battle of San Domingo (1806), where she was damaged, and suffered 21 killed and 74 wounded, the highest casualties of any British ship in the battle.

In 1807 Northumberland was part of a squadron under the command of Rear-Admiral Alexander Cochrane, who sailed in HMS Belleisle. The squadron, which included Prince George, Canada, Ramillies and Cerberus, captured Telemaco, Carvalho and Master on 17 April 1807.

Following the concern in Britain that neutral Denmark was entering an alliance with Napoleon, Northumberland participated in the expedition to occupy the Danish West Indies. The British captured St Thomas on 22 December and Santa Cruz on 25 December 1807. The Danes did not resist and the invasion was bloodless.

On 22 November 1810, Northumberland, while in the company of HMS Armada, a 74-gun third rate, captured the 14-gun French privateer ketch La Glaneuse.

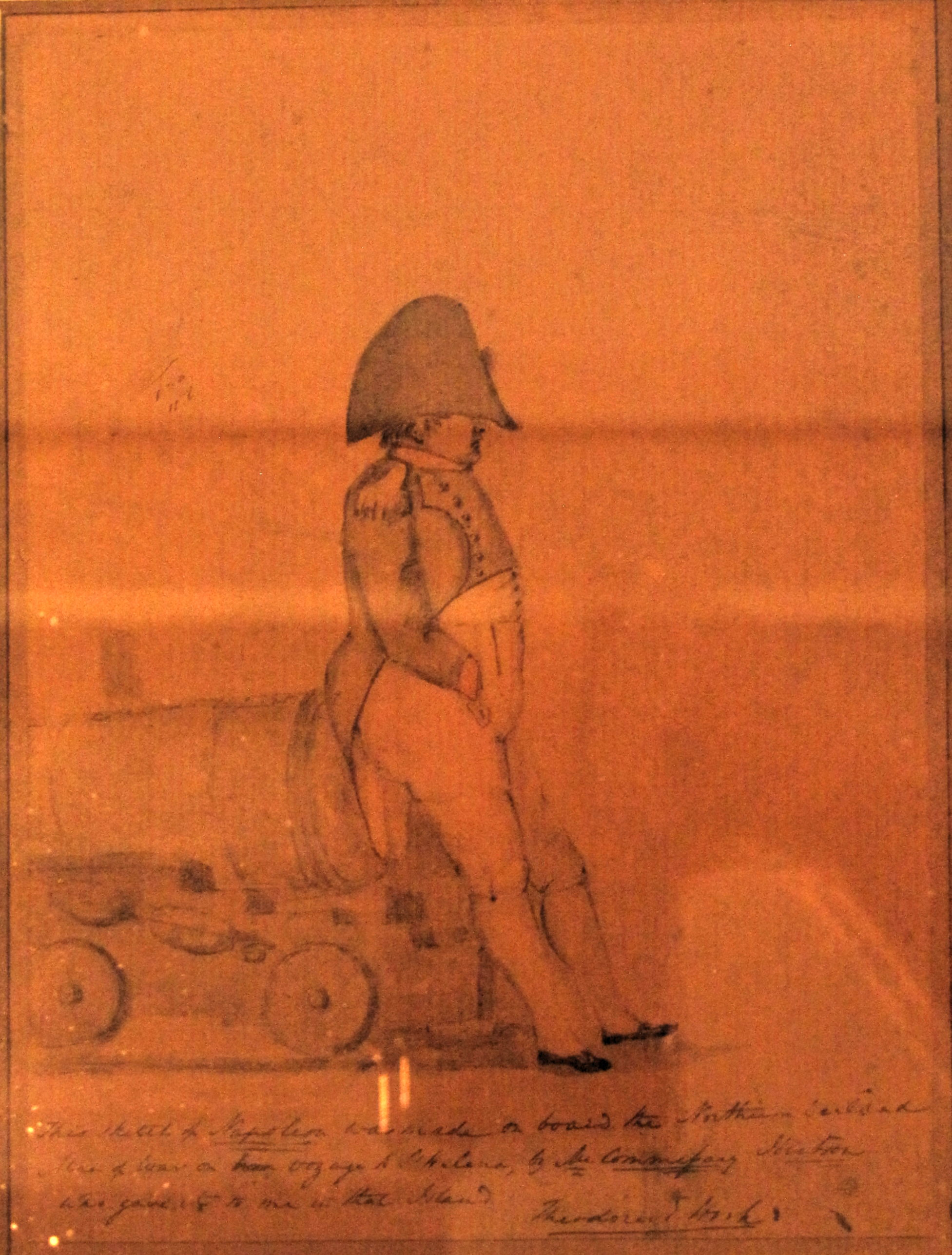
Napoléon on the ship to Saint Helena, by Denzil O. Ibbetson. Drawn aboard HMS Northumberland, 1815. Watercolour, ink and pencil.

She received a measure of fame when she transported Napoleon I into captivity on the Island of Saint Helena. Napoleon had surrendered to Captain Frederick Maitland of HMS Bellerophon, on 15 July 1815 and was then transported to Plymouth. Napoleon was transferred in Tor Bay, Devon, from Bellerophon to Northumberland for his final voyage to St. Helena because concerns were expressed about the suitability of the ageing ship. Northumberland was therefore selected instead. Under the command of Captain Charles Ross, the ship escorted Napoleon to exile in August to October 1815.

Northumberland shared with the tender Seagull in the proceeds of the seizure of some glass on Mary, of London, on 17 March 1817. (Note: A first-class share was worth £89 16s 7d; a sixth-class share, that of an able seamen, was worth 9s 2¼d.)

== Fate ==
Northumberland was converted to a hulk in February 1827. She returned to Deptford to be broken up in 1850.
