= French frigate Italienne =

French navy ship

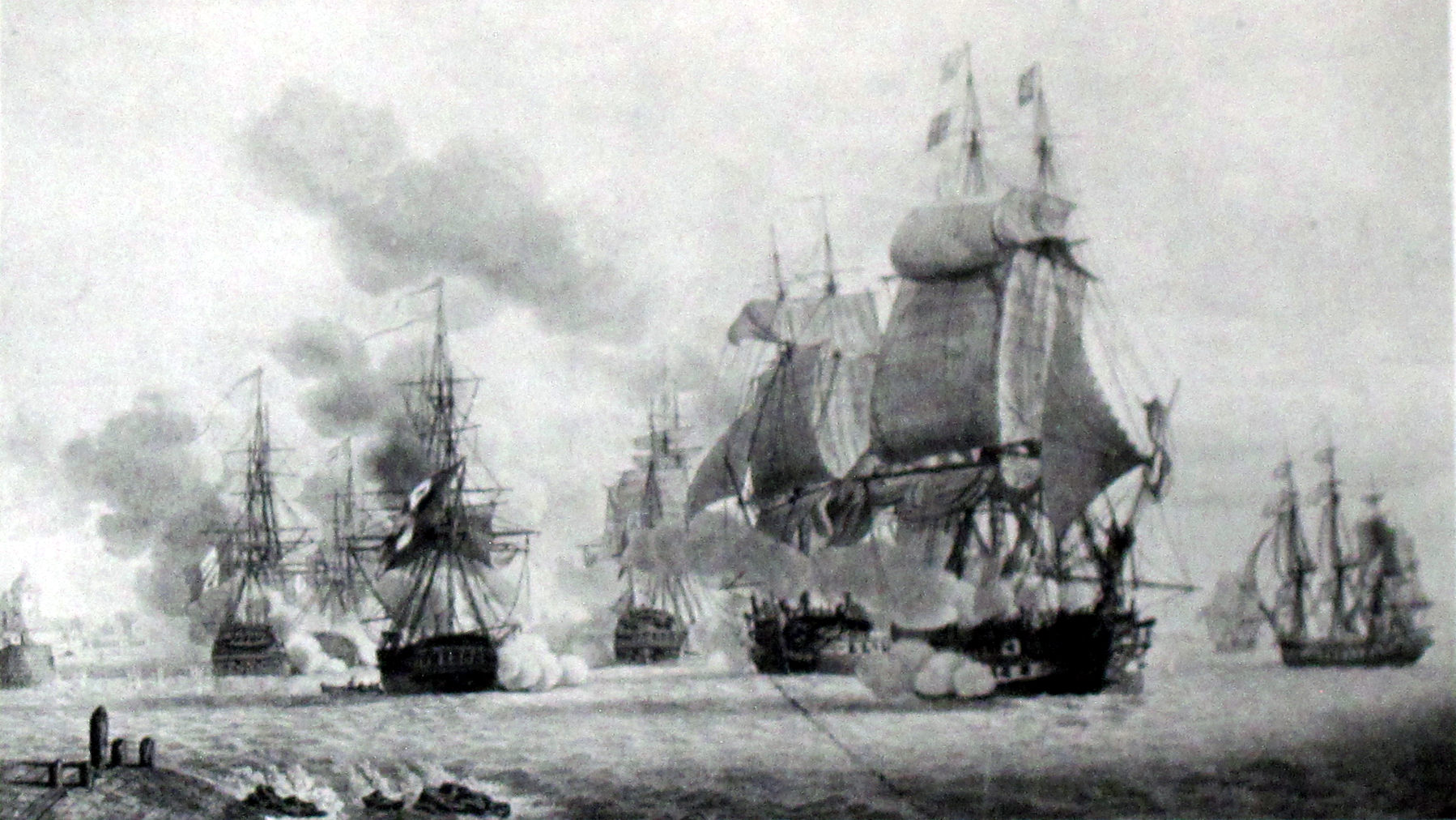
- Italienne at the Battle of Les Sables-d'Olonne in 1809

History

France
- Name: Italienne
- Namesake: Italy
- Ordered: 14 February 1803
- Builder: Ethéart company, Saint-Malo
- Laid down: March 1803 as Sultane
- Launched: 15 August 1806
- Out of service: 24 February 1809
- Stricken: November 1813
- Fate: Sold 1816

General characteristics
- Class & type: Consolante-class 40-gun frigate
- Displacement: 750 tonnes
- Propulsion: Sail
- Armament: 28 × 18-pounder long guns; 8 × 8-pounder long guns; 8 × 36-pounder carronades

Italienne was a 40-gun Consolante-class frigate of the French Navy, built by engineer Denais after plans designed by Sané and revised by François Pestel. Under Commander Jurien de La Gravière, she took part in the Battle of Les Sables-d'Olonne, where she sustained very severe damage.

== Career ==
Ordered on 14 February 1803 as Sultane, the ship was started in March of the same year. In May, she was put on keel and renamed Italienne; the name had originally been intended for Topaze, by order of 10 May 1805, but Topaze had departed Nantes under Captain François-André Baudin before it could be carried out.

Italienne was commissioned in Saint-Servan on 11 September 1806.

In early 1808 Italienne and Sirène were returning to France from Martinique when they encountered, captured, and destroyed three British merchantmen, Sappho, Sarah King, and Windham. The French put the crews on Sofia, Delaney, master, of and for New York, which brought them into Plymouth on 26 March. Sofia had been coming from Belfast. (Note: Sarah King, of 253 ton (bm), and twelve 12-pounder carronades, had been built in Falmouth in 1805. Windham, of 112 tons (bm), had been built in Yarmouth in 1781.)

In 1809, under Commodore Jurien de La Gravière, she was the flagship of a three-frigate squadron, along with Calypso and Cybèle. Trying to make junction with Willaumez' fleet in Brest, the squadron was intercepted by a British blockade squadron under Rear-Admiral Robert Stopford, comprising the ships of the line HMS Caesar, HMS Defiance, and HMS Donegal, the frigate HMS Amelia, and the brig-sloop HMS Doterel. In the ensuing Battle of Les Sables-d'Olonne, Italienne sustained extensive damage and was beached, but managed to take shelter in Les Sables-d'Olonne harbour.

Unable to effect heavy repairs, Italienne remained stranded in Les Sables-d'Olonne harbour in her battered state. The Ministry intended to send her to Nantes for repairs, but this was never effected. Italienne was struck from the Navy lists in November 1813. In 1816, she was sold as a merchantman.
