= French frigate Calypso (1807) =

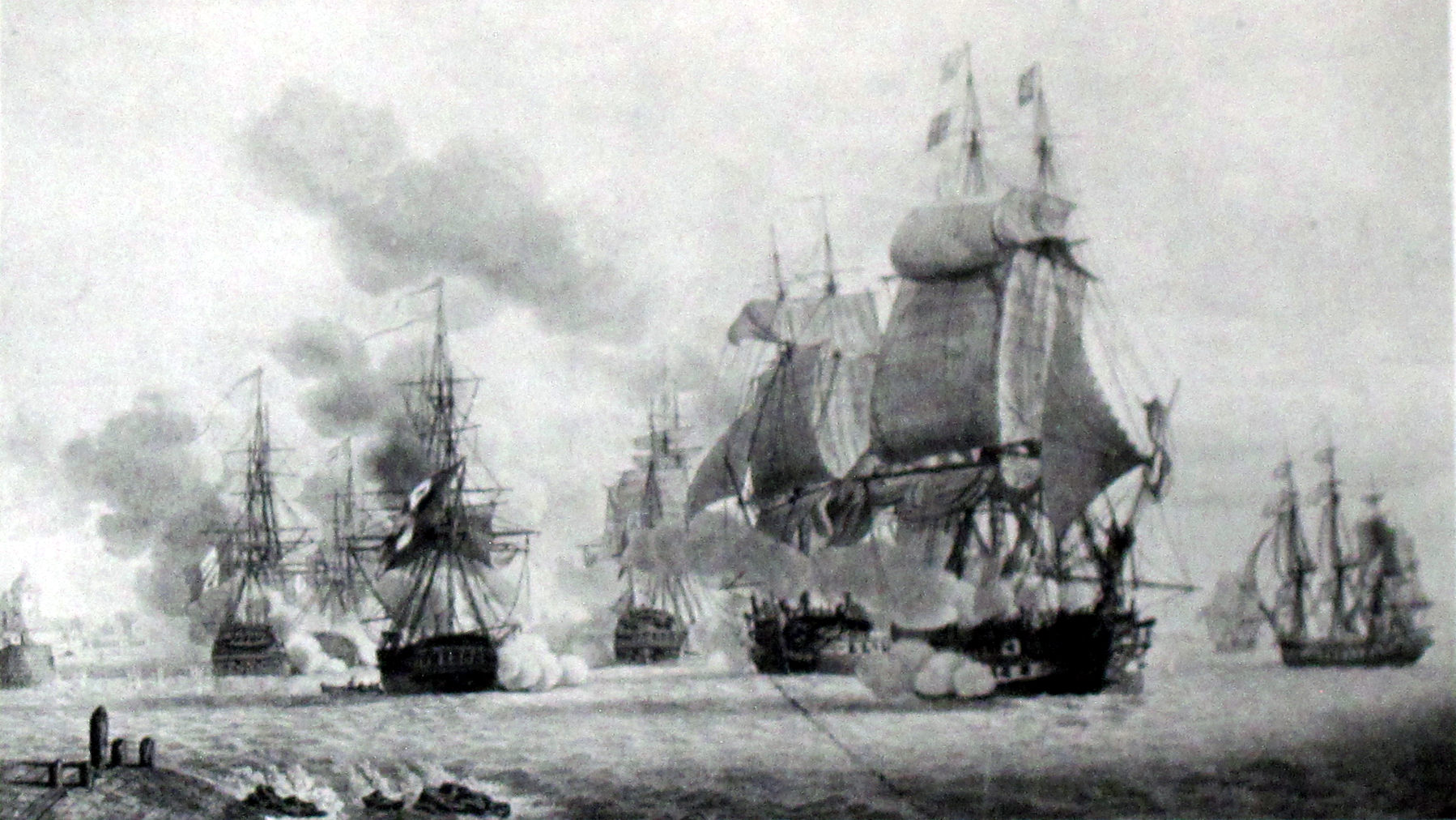
- Calypso at the Battle of Les Sables-d'Olonne in 1809

History

France
- Name: Calypso
- Namesake: Calypso
- Ordered: 6 April 1803
- Builder: Mathurin, Louis and Antoine Crucy, Lorient
- Launched: 8 January 1807
- Commissioned: 5 December 1806
- Out of service: 1810
- Fate: Sold 1814

General characteristics
- Class & type: Gloire-class 40-gun frigate
- Displacement: 750 tonnes
- Propulsion: Sail
- Armament: 44 guns: 28 × 18-pounder long guns; 2 × 8-pounder long guns; 14 × 36-pounder carronades

Calypso was a 40-gun Gloire-class frigate of the French Navy, built after plans designed by Sané revised by Forfait. Under Captain Louis-Léon Jacob, she took part in the Battle of Les Sables-d'Olonne, where she sustained very severe damage.

== Career ==
The frigate was ordered on 6 April 1803 in Nantes from the Crucy brothers, but on 14 October, it was ordered that her construction take place in Lorient instead. On 16 September, she took her name of Calypso. On 5 December 1806, she was commissioned under Captain Louis-Léon Jacob.

In 1809, she was attached to a three-frigate squadron under Commodore Jurien de La Gravière, on Italienne, along with Cybèle. Trying to make junction with Willaumez' fleet in Brest, the squadron was intercepted by a British blockade squadron under Rear-Admiral Robert Stopford, comprising the ships of the line HMS Caesar, HMS Defiance. and HMS Donegal, the frigate HMS Amelia, and the brig-sloop HMS Doterel. In the ensuing Battle of Les Sables-d'Olonne, Calypso sustained extensive damage and was driven ashore, but managed to take shelter in Les Sables-d'Olonne harbour.

Unable to effect heavy repairs, Calypso remained stranded in Les Sables-d'Olonne harbour in her battered state, until she was struck from the navy list in January 1813. She was eventually sold for use as a merchantman circa 1814.
