= Consolante-class frigate =

French frigate class

Class overview
- Name: Consolante
- Operators: French Navy; Royal Navy
- Preceded by: Gloire class
- Succeeded by: Milanaise class
- Planned: 8
- Completed: 8

General characteristics
Class & type	Consolante-class frigate
Displacement	1320 tonnes
Tons burthen	109183/94 (bm)
Length	48.75 metres (159.9 ft)
Beam	12.2 metres (40 ft)
Draught	5.9 metres (19 ft)
Propulsion	Sail
Armament	Battery: 28 x 18-pounder guns; QD and Fc: 12 x 8-pounder guns
Armour	Timber

The Consolante class frigate was a class of French warships during the Napoleonic Era. Each ship had a main battery consisting of 18-pounder long guns. The designers were François Pestel and Jacques-Noël Sané.

== List of ships ==
- Consolante

Builder: Saint Malo
Ordered:
Launched: 22 July 1800
Completed:
Fate:

- Piémontaise

Builder: Saint Servan
Ordered:
Launched: 15 November 1804
Completed:
Fate: Captured by HMS St Fiorenzo on 8 March 1808

- Italienne

Builder: Saint Servan
Ordered:
Launched: 15 August 1806
Completed:
Fate: Damaged beyond repair at the Battle of Les Sables-d'Olonne on 24 February 1809

- Danae

Builder: Genoa
Ordered:
Launched: 18 August 1807
Completed:
Fate: Exploded in Trieste harbour on 4 September 1812

- Bellone

Builder: Saint Servan
Ordered:
Launched: February 1808
Completed:
Fate: Captured during the British invasion of Isle de France on 4 December 1810

- Néréide

Builder: Saint Servan
Ordered:
Launched: December 1808
Completed:
Fate: Captured by the Royal Navy on 25 May 1811

- Illyrienne

Builder: Saint Servan
Ordered:
Launched: 13 November 1811
Completed:
Fate:

- Galatée

Builder: Genoa
Ordered:
Launched: 5 May 1812
Completed:
Fate:
