= Wright (1794 ship) =

Merchantman

History

Great Britain
- Name: Wright
- Owner: Stephen Wright
- Builder: Thomas Hearn, North Shields
- Launched: 1794
- Captured: c. December 1809

General characteristics
- Tons burthen: 341 (bm)
- Armament: 1797:4 × 6-pounder + 2 × 3-pounder guns; Royal Navy:14 × 18-pounder carronades; 1810:6 × 6-pounder guns

Wright was a merchantman launched at Shields, Northumberland, in 1794 and owned by the Newcastle mariner and brewer, Stephen Wright. From 1797 to 1801 she was a hired armed ship for the British Royal Navy during which service she captured a French privateer. She then returned to mercantile service, sailing out of Newcastle, first as a transport and then trading between Newcastle and Charleston. She was captured circa December 1809.

== Career ==
Wright first appeared in Lloyd's Register in the 1797 issue with E.Walker, master, Wright, owner, and trade Saint Petersburgh–Portsmouth.

Armed ship: Wright's contract with the Admiralty lasted from 6 May 1797 to 5 December 1801. In May 1797 Commander Thomas Campbell commissioned Wright for the North Sea.

On 7 April 1798, Wright, Captain Thomas Campbell, was about six leagues from Huntcliff when she recaptured three colliers that a French privateer had captured earlier that morning. (Note: The three colliers were Spalding, of Boston, Ranger, of Yarmouth, and Elizabeth, of Wells. Ranger, of 89 tons (bm), J.England, master, had been launched at Yarmouth in 1789.) After securing the three colliers, Campbell set out after the privateer. He captured her after a chase of about six and a half hours during which she had thrown five of her six guns overboard. Her name was Marveilleuse and she had a crew of 39 men under the command of Pierre Lefevre. She was eight days out of Dunkirk and had only taken one collier the day before. (Note: Merveilleuse was a 27-ton (French; "of load") privateer schooner from Honfleur, built on a design by the naval architect Jean-Louis Pestel. She was commissioned in 1798.) On 13 April Lloyd's List (LL) reported that the armed ship Wrights had brought into Tynemouth a privateer of six guns and her three prizes. The privateer had left Dunkirk on 2 April in company with six other privateers.

Merchantman: Wright appeared in the Register of Shipping (RS) volume for 1802 with J.Mills, master, S.Wright, owner, and trade Newcastle transport.

| Year | Master | Owner | Trade | Source |
|---|---|---|---|---|
| 1806 | S.Mills | S.Wright | Newcastle transport | RS |
| 1810 | Gillespy | S.Wright | Newcastle–Charleston | RS |

== Fate ==
LL reported on 2 January 1810 that Wright, Scott, master, of six guns and 17 men, had been captured and taken into Rotterdam.

RS continued to carry Wright for a number of years, but with data unchanged since 1809. LL had not carried Wright after the Admiralty hired her.
