= French frigate Sirène (1795) =

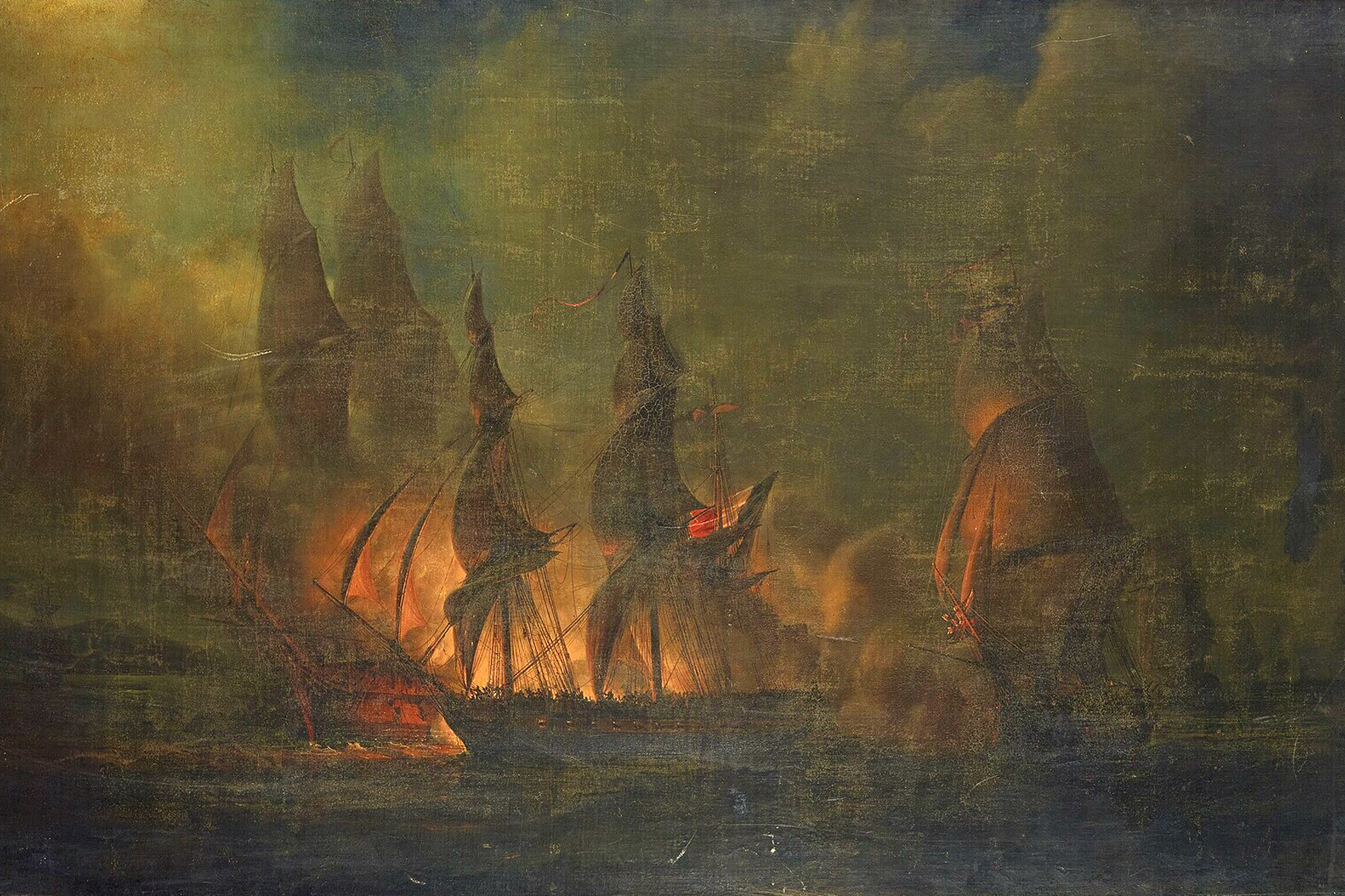
- Painting of Sirène fighting against British warships by Pierre-Julien Gilbert

History

France
- Name: Sirène
- Builder: Bayonne
- Laid down: June 1794
- Launched: 1795
- In service: 1795
- Fate: Broken up in 1825

General characteristics
- Class & type: Coquille-class frigate
- Displacement: 1,180 tonneaux
- Tons burthen: 590 port tonneaux; 898 bm
- Length: 42.8 m (140 ft 5 in)
- Beam: 11.4 m (37 ft 5 in)
- Draught: 5.3 m (17 ft 5 in)
- Depth of hold: 3.6 m (11 ft 10 in)
- Propulsion: Sails
- Sail plan: Ship
- Armament: 28 × 12-pounder + 12 × 8-pounder guns

Sirène was a 40-gun Coquille-class frigate of the French Navy. She took part in a number of campaigns and actions before she was badly damaged in a battle on 22 March 1808. Refloated after being beached to avoid capture, she was hulked. Sirène was broken up in 1825.

== French Revolutionary Wars ==
Begun as Fidèle, she was commissioned as Sirène in May 1795 under Lieutenant Charles Berrenger. She took part in the Expédition d'Irlande.

On 17 December Sirène and the French corvette Bergère were sailing to France from Cayenne when they were able to capture the East Indiaman Calcutta off Madeira. Later that morning the three encountered HMS Glenmore and Aimable, which were escorting the West India convoy from Cork. Glenmore recaptured Calcutta while Aimable engaged Sirène and Bergère. A 35-minute action ensued before the two French vessels departed. Sirène had as prisoners Captain Haggy, Calcutta's master, her first and second mates, and 50 of her lascars and seamen. Calcutta arrived in Plymouth on 12 January 1800.

== Napoleonic wars ==
On 8 June 1805 Sirène was part of a Franco-Spanish fleet under Admiral Villeneuve, which intercepted a homeward-bound convoy of 15 merchant vessels under the escort of the frigate Barbadoes and the schooner or sloop Netley. The two British warships managed to escape, but Villeneuve's fleet captured the entire convoy, valued at some five million pounds. Villeneuve sent the convoy to Guadeloupe under Sirène's escort. However, as she was escorting the prizes, she encountered several British frigates. She escaped after burning the merchantmen.

Sirène took part in the Battle of Cape Finisterre on 22 July 1805. In March of the following year, she took part in an expedition to destroy English whaling ships.

On 2 August 1806 Sirène, capitaine de frégate Le Duc, and Revanche, capitaine de frégate Lambert, captured the Greenland whalers Holderness, Swan, master, and Blenheim, Welburn, master, both of and for Hull. The French burnt their captures. Sirène also captured two other whalers, Lion, of Liverpool, and Molly, of Hull. (Note: The report was partially in error. Lion had not been taken and returned to Liverpool in late July or so. She went on to whale until at least 1816.)

In March 1808, Sirène, under Guy-Victor Duperré, and the 44-gun Italienne, under Captain Hugues Méquet, ferried troops to Martinique.

In early 1808 Sirène and Italienne were returning to France from Martinique when they encountered, captured, and destroyed three British merchantmen, Sappho, Sarah King, and Windham. The French put the crews on Sofia, Delaney, master, of and for New York, which brought the crews into Plymouth on 26 March. Sofia had been coming from Belfast. (Note: Sarah King, of 253 ton (bm), and twelve 12-pounder carronades, had been built in Falmouth in 1805. Windham, of 112 tons (bm), had been built in Yarmouth in 1781.)

On 22 March Sirène and Italienne encountered a British squadron comprising the 74-gun HMS Impetueux (Captain John Lawford) and HMS Saturn, as well as the frigates HMS Aigle (Captain George Wolfe) and HMS Narcissus, which chased them. It seemed at first that the French squadron would easily beat the British to Lorient, but as they closed to shore, the wind became too weak and the frigates had to be taken in tow by their boats. By the time wind had returned, Impetueux and Aigle had closed so much that Duperré deemed it impossible to reach Lorient before being caught, and he decided to seek the support of the batteries at Groix. At 20:30, Sirène was taken in a cross-fire of Aigle, which sailed between her and shore, and Impetueux on the other side. The gunnery exchange lasted one hour and a quarter, after which the British withdrew. Fearing that the British would attack again before he could moor Sirène in a strong defensive position, Duperré beached her at Pointe des Chats, under the Lacroix battery. Sirène was refloated on 26 March, and rejoined Italienne in Lorient harbour. This action was immortalised by a painting by Pierre-Julien Gilbert. In British literature, Sirène is sometimes mistaken for Seine.

== Fate ==
Too badly damaged to be repaired, Sirène was used as a hulk in Lorient. She was broken up in 1825.
