= Château de Gannat =

Castle in Gannat in the Allier département of France

Coordinates: 46°6′5″N 3°11′48″E

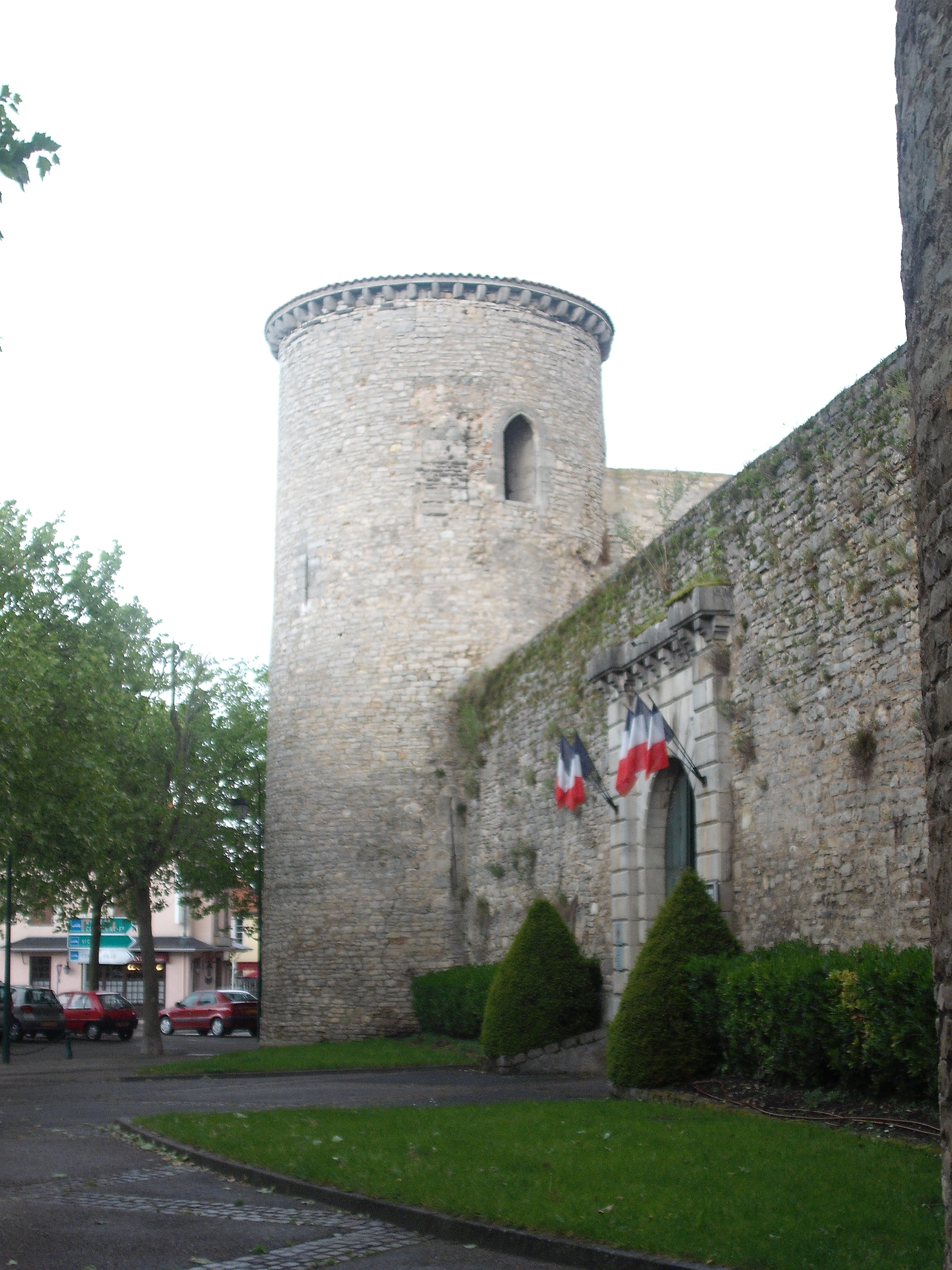
Main gate and NE tower

The Château de Gannat is a castle in the town of Gannat in the Allier département of France. The castle now houses a museum known as Musée Yves Machelon.

== Description ==
With origins in the 12th century, the Château de Gannat is a typical 14th century defensive castle, built on a square plan flanked with four machicolated towers, linked by high crenellated walls. Originally, the castle was outside the town walls and surrounded by water; it is now a feature of the town centre. By the 16th century it was uninhabitable. and much of it was dismantled in 1566. On the east wall are traces of a fireplace and two vaulted bays.

It was used as a prison from 1833 to the early 20th century.

The property of the département, the Château de Gannat has been listed since 1926 by the French Ministry of Culture as a monument historique.

== Museum ==
The museum is housed in the former prison warders' apartments and the cells. Items on display include 14th to 18th century parchments from the town's archives, a 17th-century ivory crucifix and 12th century wrought iron. A prize exhibit is a Gospel book, whose binding is even older (10th century). Other exhibits include a typical Bourbonnais kitchen, clog makers workshop, leather and farming tools. A separate section on the French Resistance displays photographs, medals and news articles about the Resistance in the local area.

== See also ==
- List of castles in France
