= Sappho (1805 ship) =

History

United Kingdom
- Name: Sappho
- Namesake: Sappho
- Builder: France
- Launched: 1803
- Acquired: c.1805 by purchase of a prize
- Fate: Captured, burnt and sunk March 1808

General characteristics
- Tons burthen: 222, or 223 (bm)
- Complement: 80
- Armament: 2 × 12-pounder guns + 14 × 12-pounder carronades

Sappho was launched in France circa 1803, probably under another name, and captured in 1804. She became a West Indiaman and then privateer that the French Navy recaptured and destroyed in March 1808.

Sappho first appeared in Lloyd's Register (LR) in the supplementary pages to the 1805 issue. She first appeared in the Register of Shipping (RS) in 1806. (There is no 1805 volume available online.)

Year	Master	Owner	Trade	Source
1805	E.Smith	Capt. & Co.	London	LR
1806	C.Bell	Capt. & Co. E.Smith	London–Jamaica	RS; damages repaired 1804
1807	C.Bell; E.Smith	Capt. Wright & Co.	London–Jamaica; London–Madeira	LR

Sappho, Bell, master, made several voyages to Jamaica and return between 1805 and 1807.

Captain Edmond Smith, of Sappo, acquired a letter of marque on 26 November 1807. The extent of her armament and the size of her crew suggest that she was a privateer.

In February 1808 Lloyd's List reported that the privateer Sappho had detained and sent into Cowes Mary, Babbidge, master, which had been on a voyage from Virginia to Amsterdam.

Capture: Prior to 10 March 1808 the French frigates Italienne and Sirène captured Sappho whilst she was sailing from London to Madeira, Portugal. They set fire to her and sank her. The frigates were returning to France from Martinique. They also captured and destroyed two other British merchant vessels, Sarah King and Windham. The French put the crews on Sofia, Delaney, master, of and for New York, which brought them into Plymouth on 26 March. Sofia had been coming from Belfast. (Note: Sarah King, of 253 ton (bm), and twelve 12-pounder carronades, had been built in Falmouth in 1805. Windham, of 112 tons (bm), had been built in Yarmouth in 1781.)
