= Gloire-class frigate =

Type of ship

Class overview
- Name: Gloire class
- Operators: French Navy; Royal Navy
- Preceded by: Uranie class
- Succeeded by: Consolante class
- Planned: 7
- Completed: 7

General characteristics
Type	Frigate
Tons burthen	1148 bm
Length	46 metres (151 ft)
Beam	12 metres (39 ft)
Draught	7 metres (23 ft)
Complement	330 men
Armament	40 guns: Battery: 28 × 18-pounder long guns; Quarterdeck and forecastle: 12 × 8-pounder long guns
Armour	Timber

The Gloire-class frigate was a type of 18-pounder 40-gun frigate, designed by Pierre-Alexandre Forfait in 1802. They were built on the specifications of the Seine-class frigate Pensée (sometimes also called Junon class).

== Ships in class ==
- Gloire

Builder: Basse-Indre
Ordered:
Launched: 20 July 1803
Completed:
Fate: captured by the British Navy 1806, becoming HMS Gloire.

- Président

Builder: Basse-Indre
Ordered:
Launched: 4 June 1804
Completed:
Fate: captured by the British Navy 1806, becoming HMS President.

- Topaze

Builder: Basse-Indre
Ordered:
Launched: 1 March 1805
Completed:
Fate: captured by the British Navy 1809, becoming HMS Alcmene.

- Vénus

Builder: Le Havre
Ordered:
Launched: 5 April 1806
Completed:
Fate: captured by the British Navy 1810, becoming HMS Nereide.

- Junon

Builder: Le Havre
Ordered:
Launched: 16 August 1806
Completed:
Fate: captured by the British Navy 1809, becoming HMS Junon.

- Calypso

Builder: Lorient
Ordered:
Launched: 9 January 1807
Completed:
Fate: severely damaged 1809, sold 1813 or 1814.

- Amazone

Builder: Le Havre
Ordered:
Launched: 20 July 1807
Completed:
Fate: burnt by the Royal Navy 1811.
