= Jean-Louis Pestel =

French shipbuilder and naval architect

Jean-Louis Pestel was a French ship builder and naval architect active in the late 18th and early 19th centuries. He was the older brother of François Pestel, who was also a ship builder and naval architect. Vessels Jean-Louis Pestel built or designed include:

- Aventurier was a 12-gun brig launched in 1793 that the Royal Navy captured in 1798. The British named her HMS Aventurier and disposed of her in 1802.
- Rhinocéros was a 22-gun storeship (gabarre) launched in 1794 and condemned in 1807. She then served as a prison hulk in 1806.
- Serpente was a Serpente-class corvette launched in 1795 and broken up in 1815.
- Merveilleuse was a 27-ton (French; "of load") privateer schooner from Honfleur, commissioned in 1798. His Majesty's hired armed ship Wright captured her on 7 April 1798.
- French corvette Décidée was a Triomphante-class corvette-cannonière launched at Honfleur in 1804 that the Dutch seized at Antwerp in May 1814 and condemned.
- French corvette Vaillant was a Triomphante-class corvette-cannonière launched at Honfleur in 1804 that the Dutch seized in May 1814 in the Scheld, renamed and Bruinvisch in May 1815, and sold for breaking up in 1822.
