= French corvette Aventurier =

1793 gun-brig

Aventurier
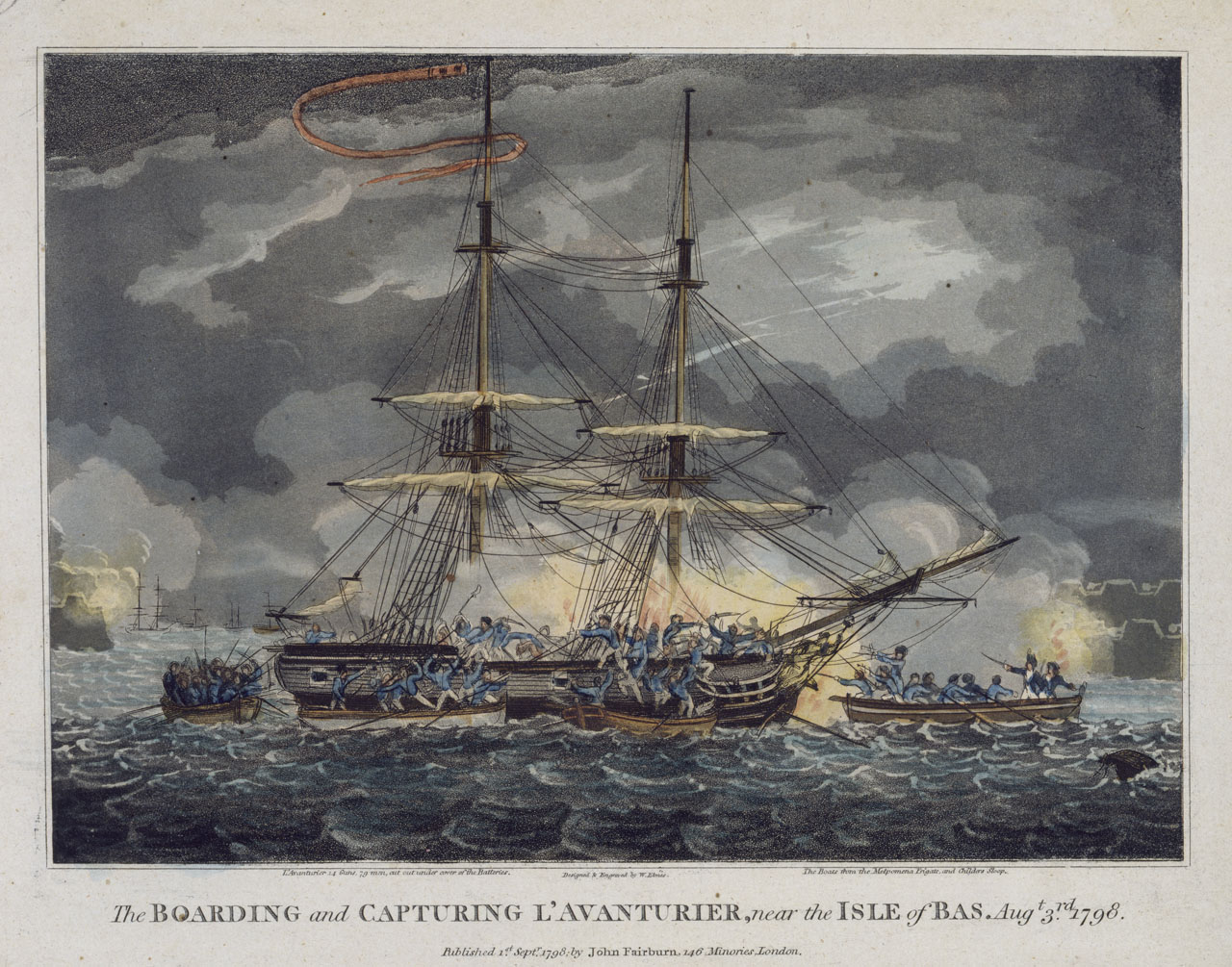
- Boats from HMS Melpomene and HMS Childers cutting out Aventurier; National Maritime Museum

History

France
- Name: Aventurier
- Namesake: French: "Adventurer"
- Builder: Honfleur
- Laid down: March 1793
- Launched: 24 July 1793
- In service: October 1793
- Captured: 4 August 1798

Great Britain
- Name: HMS Aventurier
- Acquired: 4 August 1798 by capture
- Out of service: 1802
- Fate: Disposed of 1802

General characteristics
- Displacement: 250 tons
- Tons burthen: 192 (bm)
- Length: 24.04 m (78.9 ft)
- Beam: 6.82 m (22.4 ft)
- Sail plan: Brig
- Complement: French service: 80-95; British service:90
- Armament: French service: 12 × 4-pounder, or 6-pounder guns; British service: 14 × 4-pounder guns + 2 × 12-pounder carronades

Aventurier (or Avanturier), was a 16-gun brig of the French Navy. She was launched in 1793 and the Royal Navy captured her in 1798. The British named her HMS Aventurier and disposed of her in 1802.

== French service ==
Aventurier was built as a privateer to a design by Jean-Louis Pestel, but the French navy requisitioned her while she was still in the stocks. She was fitted out at Le Havre in October–November 1793, though there were problems with respect to arming her fully. She then patrolled between Havre and Dieppe, first under captain Fallouard, and then under Lieutenant Harang. From February to June 1795 she escorted convoys between Cherbourg and Brest.

On 10 June 1796, she grounded off Pontusval, near Brignogan. Refloated, she cruised near the Île de Batz under Lieutenant Hurtel. From January 1797 she cruised out of Saint Malo.

== Capture ==
On 4 August 1798 she was under the command of Lieutenant René-Guillaume Raffi (or Raffy) and anchored in the port of Corréjou or Corigiou. Here the boats of Melpomene and Childers cut her out. British casualties were one man killed, one missing and four wounded. The French casualties were 16 wounded, several mortally. The attack took place at night and in bad weather. To get Aventurier out of the port took two hours because of the weather conditions and took place under fire from the forts that protected the port. All-in-all, the operation was a daring and arduous one. The subsequent court martial of Lieutenant Raffi, who had been wounded at the start of the attack on his vessel, acquitted him for the loss.

== Royal Navy ==
She was brought into British service as HMS Aventurier. She appears to have had a short, unremarkable career, appearing only once in the Naval Chronicle, when she was reported to have arrived at Plymouth on 27 April 1800, having escorted a convoy. At the time she was under the command of Lieutenant Birdwood. Nor does she appear in the London Gazette. (Note: The database of the National Maritime Museum acknowledges that Melpomene and Childers captured an Adventurier, but has no record of an Aventurier, Adventurier, or Adventurer.)

== Fate ==
She was deleted from the list of vessels of the Royal Navy in 1802.
