= Gannat =

- Commune
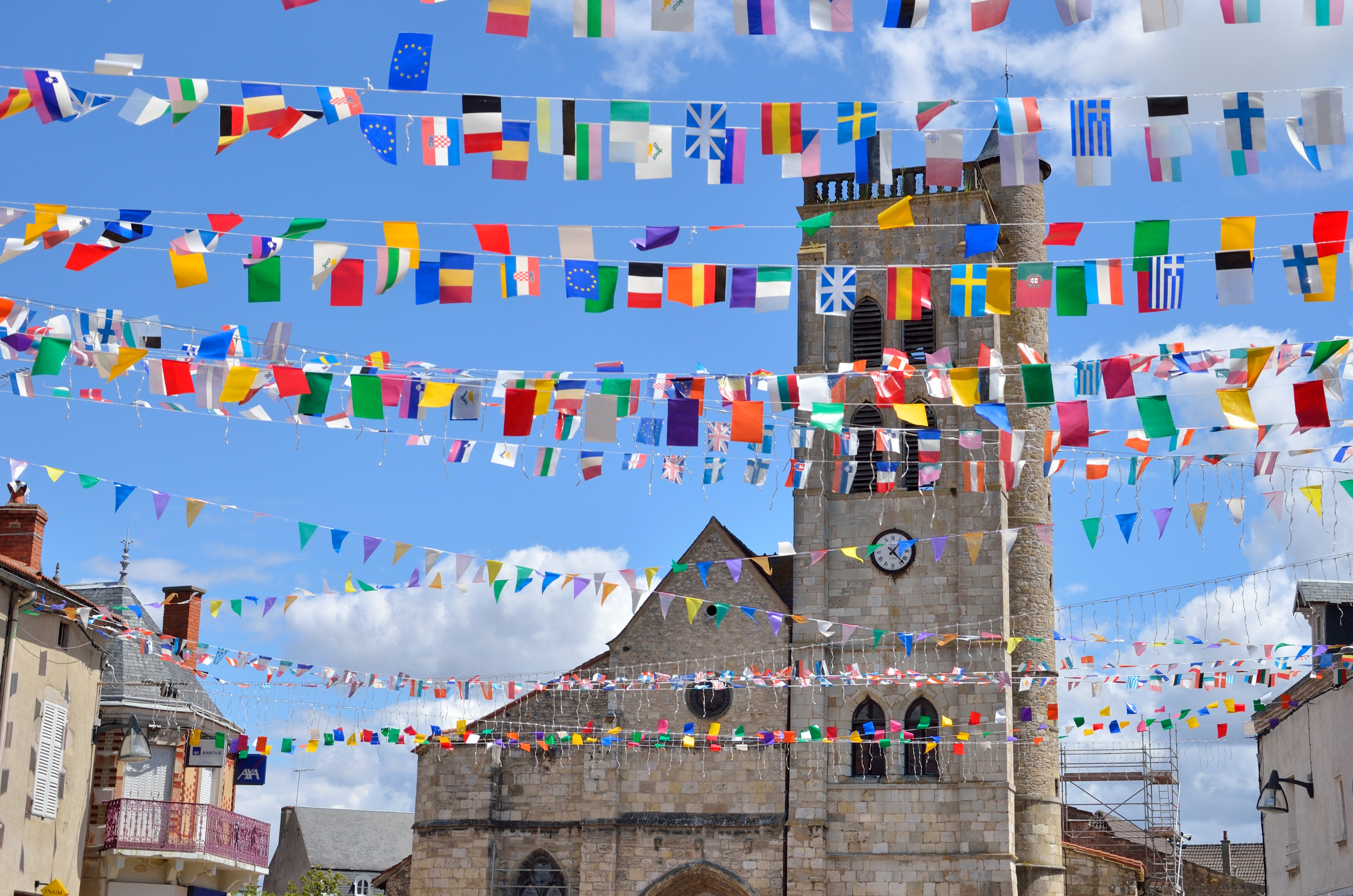
- The church in Gannat

- Coat of arms
- Location of Gannat
- Location within France Location within Auvergne-Rhône-Alpes
- Coordinates: 46°06′02″N 3°11′57″E
- Country: France
- Region: Auvergne-Rhône-Alpes
- Department: Allier
- Arrondissement: Vichy
- Canton: Gannat
- Intercommunality: Saint-Pourçain Sioule Limagne

Government
  - Mayor (2026–32): Véronique Pouzadoux
- Area^{1}: 36.85 km^{2} (14.23 sq mi)
- Highest elevation: 547 m (1,795 ft)
- Lowest elevation: 312 m (1,024 ft)
- Population (2023): 5,610
  - Density: 152/km^{2} (394/sq mi)
- Time zone: UTC+01:00 (CET)
  - Summer (DST): UTC+02:00 (CEST)
- INSEE/Postal code: 03118 /03800
- ^{1} French Land Register data, which excludes lakes, ponds, glaciers > 1 km^{2} (0.386 sq mi or 247 acres) and river estuaries.

Gannat (French pronunciation: [ɡana]; Auvergnat: Gatnat) is a commune in the Allier department in central France.

Gannat was a sub-prefecture until 1926, with a population of around 5,800 inhabitants. There is a castle (the Château de Gannat), two churches of which one (Saint-Étienne) is partly Romanesque with a 9th-century Gospel Book. The Cultures du Monde Festival is held every July. The patron saint of Gannat is Saint Procule.

== History ==
The most ancient discoveries in Gannat, ancestors of the rhinoceros from the end of the Oligocene and start of the Miocene, date back 23 million years. Gannat seems to have been a veritable cemetery for these creatures, so many of their remains have been discovered. Also found are fossils of fish, reptiles, tortoises, crocodiles, galliform birds, mammals, marsupials, insectivores, rodents and carnivores. The site is particularly rich in rhinoceros. From 1854, Duvernoy has even described a specimen as Acerotherium gannatense (the official name is Diaceratherium lemanense). The most complete rhinoceros skeleton was discovered in 1993 when significant fossils were uncovered at the Sichaux quarry by paleontologist François Escuillié (notable discoverer of a small proboscidian mammal, ancestor of the elephant from 50 million years ago). Escuillié was behind the establishment of the Rhinopolis Association in 1994 and founder of Eldonia, a society for those specialising in the renovation of fossils and whose activities are linked to Rhinopolis. The Rhinopolis Association is still active in the Gannat quarries and, since the 1990s, has discovered numerous rhinoceros bones.

Gannat is a very important locality for paleontology. Studies on the fossilised fauna of the Oligocene and early Miocene of the region have been significant not just regionally but throughout France, Europe and internationally.

From primitive occupation to the Gallo-Roman period Motorway building work around Gannat has allowed the discovery of quartz works which date back 800,000 years. Deposits at Clos de Montsala have revealed bifaces and bone fragments indicating the presence of hunters around 300,000 years ago.

A structure composed of small limestone blocks containing numerous horse bones as well as an original stone works are the only remains of a small group of hunters who came from the north 17,000 years ago.

The discovery of fossils, silos, wells, ceramics, bronze or blue glass bracelets, enclosures with entrances, ashes and wood charcoal show that the region was already widely occupied from the final Bronze Age to the Second Iron Age.

After the resistance of the Gauls at Gergovie and the defeat of Vercingétorix at Alésia in 52BC, Gannat was occupied by Romans interested in the riches of the Limagne. They developed cultivation by draining the soil.

The Gauls were "Romanised" little by little and many Gallo-Roman structures can be found in surrounding communes. Artisans flourished to satisfy Roman demand. Discoveries from the first century AD include thirty moulds, vases, an oven and two pottery medicine jars. Construction materials were imported and exchanged for local craft or agricultural products. Urban centres developed, as well as roads, linking Clermont to Menat, Biozat, Vichy, Gannat, Bègues and Chantelle.

== Population ==
Historical population
Year	Pop.	±% p.a.
1968	5,967	—
1975	6,355	+0.90%
1982	6,255	−0.23%
1990	5,919	−0.69%
1999	5,838	−0.15%
2007	5,881	+0.09%
2012	5,806	−0.26%
2017	5,832	+0.09%
2023	5,610	−0.64%
Source: INSEE

== Access and transport ==
Gannat is situated on the D2009 (previously the Route nationale 9) between Moulins and Clermont-Ferrand), D2209 to Vichy and D998 to Néris-les-Bains. It is 18 kilometres west of Vichy and 43 kilometres north of Clermont-Ferrand.

Gannat is linked to the A71 autoroute by the 24 km-long A719 autoroute.

Gannat is served by the Montluçon - Lapeyrouse and Clermont-Ferrand to Lyon and Bordeaux railway lines (until 2008).

== Sights ==
- Sainte-Croix Gallican church
- Saint-Étienne Romanesque church
- Château de Gannat (castle, used as prison during the Vichy regime, now a museum)
- Le Mont Libre : site of numerous traces of prehistory, now exhibited in the Gannat museum La *Chapel at Butte de Gannat : site protected for its flora

== Personalities ==
- Pierre Roch Jurien de La Gravière, 1772–1849, naval officer
- Jean Coulon: 1853–1923, sculpture
- Sandrine Bonnaire : French actress
- Jean-Marc Lhermet : rugby player, former international and player for ASM Clermont Auvergne and now manager of the club
- Jean Roche : Founder of the "Festival Des Cultures Du Monde"
- Pierre François Sauret de la Borie : général d'empire
- François Escuillié : paleontologist, founder of Rhinopolis
- Joseph Hennequin (1748–1837) : politician
- Monseigneur François de Fontanges (1744–1806) : Bishop of Nancy from 1783 to 1787, Archbishop of Bourges from 1787 to 1788, Archbishop of Toulouse from 1788 to 1801, Archbishop of Autun from 1802 to 1806.
- Victor Fontoynont (1880–1958), Hellenist.

== See also ==
- Château de Gannat
- Communes of the Allier department
