= Edmond Jurien de La Gravière =

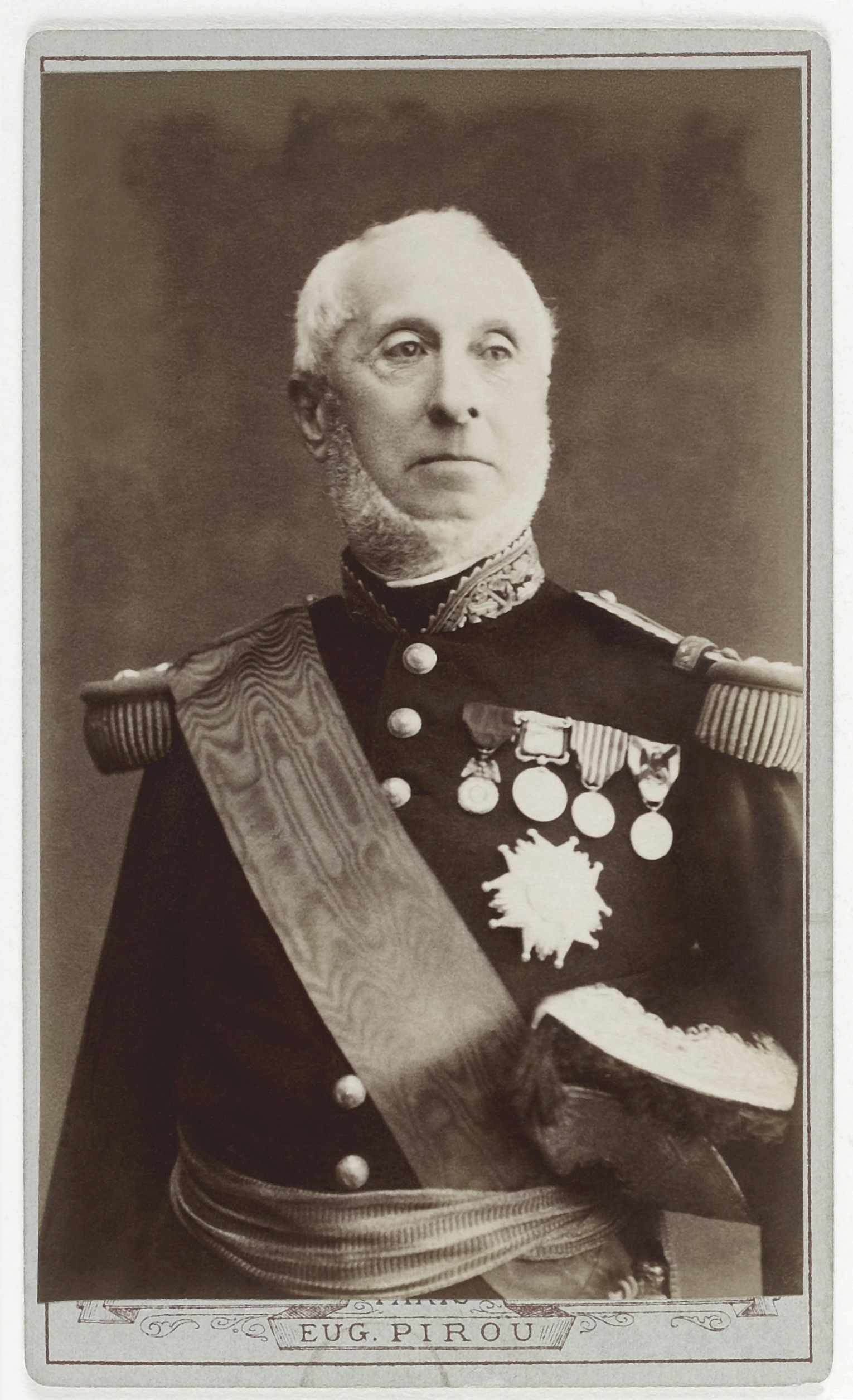
- Born: 19 November 1812; Brest (France)
- Died: 5 March 1892 (aged 79); Paris
- Resting place: Montmartre Cemetery
- Occupation: Writer, officer
- Awards: Médaille militaire (1870)

Signature
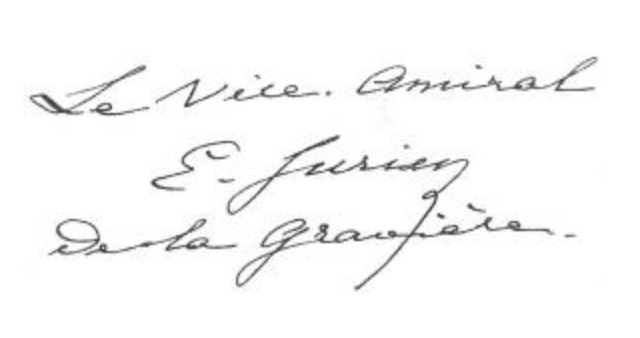
- Position held: seat 6 of the Académie française (1888–1889), president of the French Academy of Sciences (1886–1886)
- Rank: vice admiral
- Branch: French Navy

Jean Pierre Edmond Jurien de La Gravière (19 November 1812 in Brest, Finistère – 5 March 1892) was a French admiral, son of Admiral Pierre Roch Jurien de La Gravière, who served through the Revolutionary and Napoleonic Wars and was a peer of France under Louis-Philippe.

== Biography ==
He entered the navy in 1827, was made a commander in 1841, and captain in 1850. During the Crimean War he commanded a ship in the Black Sea. He was promoted to be rear-admiral on 1 December 1855, and appointed to the command of a squadron in the Adriatic in 1859, when he absolutely sealed the Austrian ports with a close blockade. In October 1861 he was appointed to command the squadron in the Gulf of Mexico, and two months later the expedition against Mexico.

On 15 January 1862 he was promoted to be vice-admiral. During the Franco-Prussian War of 1870 he had command of the French Mediterranean fleet, and in 1871 he was appointed director of charts. As having commanded in chief before the enemy, the age-limit was waived in his favor, and he was continued on the active list. Jurien died on 4 March 1892.

He was an author of voluminous works on naval history and biography, most of which first appeared in the Revue des deux mondes. Among the most noteworthy of these are Guerres maritimes sous la république et sous l’empire, which was translated by Lord Dunsany under the title of Sketches of the Last Naval War (1848); La Marine d'autrefois (1865), largely autobiographical; and La Marine d'aujourd'hui (1872). In 1866 he was elected a member of the Academy.

== Works ==
- Jurien de la Gravière, Edmond (1888). L'amiral Baudin. Les gloires maritimes de la France. Paris: E. Plon.
