= Triomphante-class corvette-cannonière =

Class overview
- Name: Triomphante
- Operators: French Navy
- Preceded by: Foudre-class corvette-canonnières
- In commission: 1804–1826
- Completed: 4
- Lost: 1
- Retired: 3

General characteristics
- Type: Corvette-canonnière
- Displacement: 261 ton (French)
- Tons burthen: 170 (bm)
- Length: 27.28 m (89 ft 6 in) (overall); 24.93 m (81 ft 9 in) (keel)
- Beam: 6.82 m (22 ft 5 in)
- Draught: 2.92 m (9 ft 7 in)
- Depth of hold: 2.71 m (8 ft 11 in)
- Propulsion: Sail
- Complement: 80
- Armament: 4 × 24-pounder long guns
- Armour: Timber

The Triomphante class was a class of four small corvettes (described as "corvette-canonnières") built for the French Navy, designed by Jean-Francois Chaumont as a follow-on to the Foudre-class corvette-canonnières (which had been designed by engineer Jean Tupinier to transport Napoleon himself and his general officers and staff during the planned invasion of England). Two of the Triomphante-class were built by Jean Tupinier himself at Le Havre, and two by Jean-Louis Pestel at Honfleur. The vessels were flush-decked and designed to carry a battery of four 24-pounder guns.

== Triomphante class (4 ships) ==
- Triomphante

Builder: Le Havre Naval Dockyard
(constructed under Jean Tupinier)
Begun: December 1803
Launched: 5 April 1804
Completed: May 1804
Fate: Broken up at Rochefort in July 1826.

- Décidée

Builder: Jean-Louis Pestel, Honfleur
Begun: December 1803
Launched: 11 April 1804
Completed: May 1804
Fate: Seized at Antwerp by the Dutch in May 1814.

- Vaillante

Builder: Jean-Louis Pestel, Honfleur
Begun: December 1803
Launched: 11 April 1804
Completed: May 1804
Fate: Seized at Antwerp by the Dutch in May 1814.

- Heureuse

Builder: Le Havre Naval Dockyard (constructed under Jean Tupinier)
Begun: December 1803
Launched: 20 April 1804
Completed: May 1804
Fate: Probably burnt by the French at the evacuation of Willemstad, North Brabant in December 1813.
