= Louis Léon Jacob =

French admiral

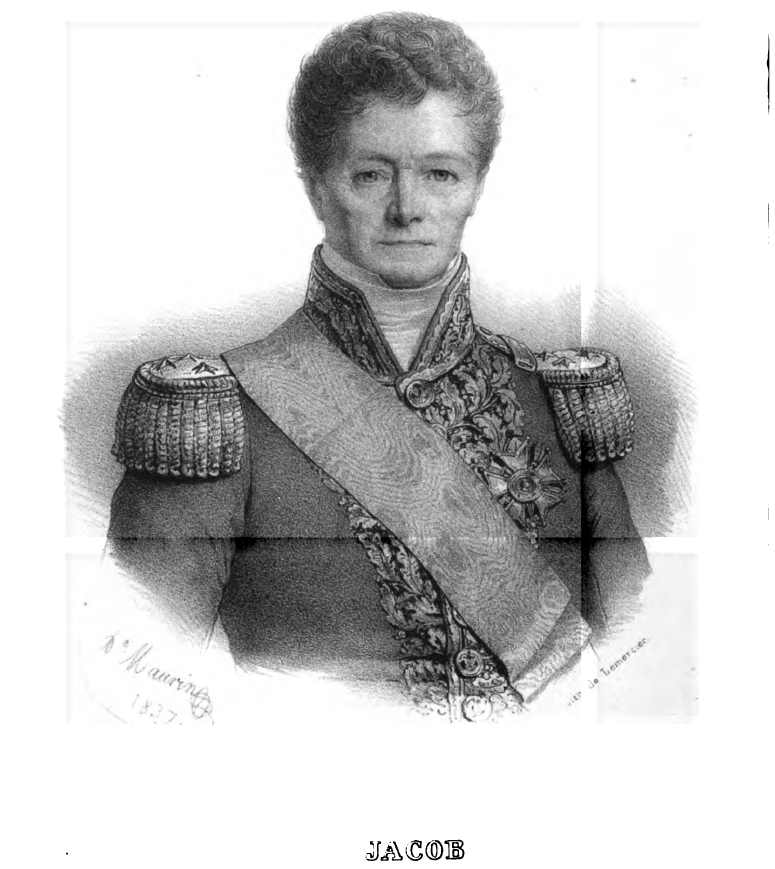

member of the Chamber of Peers
- In office 1831–1848

Minister of Marine
- In office 1834

Governor of Guadeloupe
- In office 1823–1826

Personal details
- Born: 11 November 1768 Tonnay, Charente
- Died: 14 March 1854 (aged 85)

Military service
- Branch/service: French Navy
- Rank: rear admiral

Louis Léon Jacob (French pronunciation: [lwi le.ɔ̃ ʒakɔb]; 11 November 1768 – 14 March 1854) was a French admiral.

He was born at Tonnay, Charente, was educated at Rochefort, and volunteered from a clerkship in the marine bureau to the navy (1784). He was promoted to ensign in 1793, served as a lieutenant on the Ça Ira in her fight against a superior British force on 14 March 1795, and was taken prisoner when the ship was captured.

After his release, Jacob was appointed to the frigate Bellone. He took part in the Battle of Tory Island and was again taken prisoner when Bellone surrendered to Ethalion.

Jacob later took part in the campaign in Santo Domingo in 1801, was Captain at Granville (1805), helping Piémontaise in Saint-Servan, capturing two gun-brigs HMS Teazer and HMS Plumper near Chaussey, and after at Naples (1806). He took part in the Battle of Les Sables-d'Olonne. He was made a rear admiral in 1812 and in 1814 defended Rochefort.

He retired on the Restoration, reentered active service in 1820, was Governor of Guadeloupe from 1823 to 1826, prepared the expedition against Morocco and Algiers (1827), served on the Admiralty Board until 1834, when he became Minister of Marine, and was aide-de-camp to Louis Philippe until 1848. He introduced in 1805 a system of semaphores which was long used in the French navy.

== External links and sources ==
"Notice no. LH 1339/9". Base Léonore (in French).
