= François Pestel =

French naval engineer

François Timothée Benjamin Pestel (13 December 1763 in Honfleur – 1828) was a French naval engineer of the Age of Sail. He was the younger brother of the French ship builder and naval architect Jean-Louis Pestel.

== Biography ==
Pestel notably worked on the Abeille-class brigs, other brigs and the Consolante-class frigates. By 1824, he was a Knight of the Legion of Honour and of the Order of Saint Louis.
