= HMS Doterel (1808) =

Brig-sloop of the Royal Navy

- Dotterell

History

United Kingdom
- Name: HMS Doterel
- Namesake: Eurasian dotterel
- Ordered: 31 December 1807
- Builder: John Scott and Richard Blake, Bursledon
- Laid down: April 1808
- Launched: 6 October 1808
- Commissioned: October 1808
- Honours and awards: Naval General Service Medal clasp "Basque Roads 1809"
- Fate: Broken up 1855

General characteristics
- Type: Cruizer-class brig-sloop
- Tons burthen: 38611/94 (bm)
- Length: 100 ft 2 in (30.5 m) (overall); 77 ft 2 1/4 in (23.5 m) (keel)
- Beam: 30 ft 8 in (9.3 m)
- Depth of hold: 12 ft 10 in (3.9 m)
- Propulsion: Sail
- Complement: 121
- Armament: 16 × 32-pounder carronades; 2 × 6-pounder long guns for bow chasers

HMS Doterel (or Dotterel), was an 18-gun Cruizer-class brig-sloop of the British Royal Navy. Launched on 6 October 1808, she saw action in the Napoleonic Wars and in the War of 1812. In February 1809 she took part in the Battle of Les Sables-d'Olonne, then in April the Battle of Basque Roads. She was laid up in 1827 at Bermuda, but not broken up until 1855.

== Career ==
=== Napoleonic Wars ===
Doterel was first commissioned under Commander Anthony Abdy in October 1808. By February 1809 she was in the Basque Roads and had become attached to a squadron under Robert Stopford when on 27th of that month she took part in the Battle of Les Sables-d'Olonne.

Stopford in the 80-gun Caesar had been accompanied by the seventy-fours Defiance and Donegal, and the 36-gun frigates Emerald, Amethyst and Naiad, when he had chased a French force comprising eight ships of the line and two frigates, into the Pertuis d'Antioche. Stopford immediately sent Naiad to appraise Admiral James Gambier of the situation but Naiad had not gone too far when she signalled that there were three other vessels to the north-west. Stoppard ordered Amethyst and Emerald to remain while he and the rest of the squadron set off in pursuit.

When daylight came, the vessels sighted by Naiad were revealed to be the three French frigates, Calypso, Italienne and Sybille, being chased by Doterel and the 36-gun frigate Amelia. Doterel and Amelia had drawn so close to Sybille, the nearest French ship, that her two companions shortened sail in preparation for battle but on seeing Stopford's approaching squadron, all three French ships took off with Doterel and Amelia in close pursuit. At 10:00 the French frigates arrived at Sable d'Olonne where they anchored with springs, in the shallow water beneath the town's batteries. Caeser, Donegal, Defiance and Amelia stood in and engaged. Two of the French frigates were obliged to cut their cables and run ashore in order to escape before the British were forced to withdraw by the falling tide. However, all three French frigates were destroyed in the action.

Doterel was part of Gambier's fleet when it fought the Battle of the Basque Roads in April 1809. The French ships were anchored under the protection of the powerful batteries on the Isle d'Aix when on 11 April Lord Cochrane led an attacking force of fireships and explosive vessels. At this time, Doterel was employed in a passive role, providing a diversion to the east of the island with the brigs Beagle, Conflict, and Growler, and the 36-gun frigate Emerald. The fireships were a partial success; the French, having suspected such an attack, had rigged a boom across the channel but this was breached by one of the explosive vessels. The French cut their cables and drifted on to the shoals. Later on 13 April, Doterel, Foxhound, and Redpole, carrying letters from Gambier, arrived in the Maumossen Passage where Cochrane had retired from attacking the grounded French fleet due to the falling tide.

In October 1810 Doterel was commissioned for service in the West Indies, and in December command passed to William Westcott Daniel. Daniel was still in command in early October 1812, when Doterel was back in home waters, part of a squadron under Alexander Cochrane.

On 25 April 1812 Dotterell and Niobe encountered two French frigates and a brig, steering NE. Dotterell arrived at Lisbon on 3 April and left the next day with Impeteux in search of the enemy. On 4 October Dotterell arrived at Plymouth with the French privateer Elconore of 14 guns and 80 men. Dotterell had captured Elconore the day before off the Isles of Scilly. Elconore had captured the transport Bush & Dreghorn, from Lisbon. Official records reported that Doterel had been in company with Raven and Marlborough, that the privateer's name was Eleonore (or Leonore), and that she had been armed with 10 guns.

=== War of 1812 ===
On 22 March 1813 Dart, a prize to Dotterell, arrived at Portsmouth. Dart had been sailing from New Hampshire to Bordeaux. On 2 November Doterel and Recruit drove the letter of marque schooner Inca on the shoals at Cape Romain. Inca was armed with six 12-pounder carronades and carried a crew of 35 men. (Note: Inca, of 239 tons (bm), was under the command of Captain Alexander Thompson. She had been launched at Baltimore in 1807 and commissioned there as a privateer on 13 August 1812 and again on 2 October 1813. She was totally lost.)

In 1814 Dotterel served on the North American Station in the war against the United States, capturing the 14-gun American privateer Dominica on 22 May. On 14 November 1814 the American privateer Saucy Jack captured Hasard, Dunford, master, as Hasard was sailing from Matanzas to Bermuda. Dotterell recaptured Hasard and sent her into Bermuda. On 24 August 1814, Dotterell chased the privateer Pike, of Baltimore, on shore and destroyed her. (Note: Pike was a schooner of 275 tons (bm), six guns, and 37 men under the command of Captain H. Bolton.)

In January 1815, Doterel was part of a task force under George Cockburn, which looted St Simons and its neighbouring islands in Georgia, carrying away cotton and freeing slaves who were later resettled on Bermuda. She returned to Portsmouth on 12 May 1815.

=== Post-war and fate ===
In August 1815 she was laid up at Chatham.

Commander John Gore was appointed to Doterel on 13 February 1818, which he commissioned and which and served out of Cork. On 16 November 1820, Doterel seized the American schooner Volunteer. Gore received promotion to post captain on 19 July 1821. (Note: His promotion was one of several granted to celebrate the coronation of George IV.)

William Hendry assumed command in July 1821 and sailed for Halifax on the North American Station. In July 1822, Richard Hoare took command. Hoare spent just over three years in charge before he was superseded by Henry Edwards in August 1825. Doterel's last commander was William Hamilton, who arrived on board in August 1826.

The Admiralty found Doterel to be in such a defective state, she was ordered to be laid up in Bermuda on 4 April 1827, where she was used as a residence for workmen there. On 28 August 1848, Doterel was ordered to be broken up, but the order was not carried out until some seven years later.
