= Pierre Roch Jurien de La Gravière =

French naval officer (1772–1849)

Pierre Roch Jurien de La Gravière (5 November 1772 – 14 January 1849) was a French naval officer.

== Biography ==
Born at Gannat in Allier, La Gravière entered the service under the name Jurien Desvarennes as a novice pilot on the corvette La Favorite in May 1786.

Volunteer aspirant on the frigate La Flore 29 November 1787, aspirant, 1st class, and ship-of-the-line ensign on the corvette L'Espérance in November 1791 and January 1793, he was named ship-of-the-line lieutenant on 6 Vendémiaire, year III, and captain of a frigate on 24 Nivôse, year VI.

He participated in the Entrecasteaux expedition, which Louis XVI and the Constituent Assembly directed to search for the earlier La Pérouse expedition, as well as conduct scientific research in the Pacific Ocean.

In the year XI, he commanded La Franchise during the Léogane Affair. In his report, the vicomte de Rochambeau, general-in-chief of the Army of Saint-Domingue, made note of him as an officer distinguished by his intelligence and bravery and demanded he receive the rank of ship-of-the-line captain, which was granted on the 13th of Ventôse.

In the year XII, he was made a French legionnaire in Pluviôse and an officer of the order on 25 Prairial. He received the latter again in February 1809. He fought in 1809 at the battle of Sables-d'Olonne, where three frigates under his command were wrecked beyond repair by a superior British squadron.

On 5 July 1814, La Gravière was named a knight of Saint Louis.

On 13 November of that year, he was the commander of a division which went from Rochefort in order to take possession of Île Bourbon. On 10 February 1815, he reached the cape; on 6 April, he installed the new governor of the island; and on 27 August, he moored in the Roadstead of Brest.

He was promoted to counter admiral on 28 October 1817, named president of the electoral college of Finistère on 10 March 1819, made a commander of the Legion of Honour on 28 April 1821, and commanded the French Brazil station the same year.

Made a Commander of the Order of Saint Louis on 22 May 1825, he commanded the French station for the Antilles and the Gulf of Mexico. He was one of the commanders of the Baron Mackau's expedition to Haiti which forced it to provide reparations to former French slave owners from the island.

He was named on 7 January 1827 as the naval prefect of the 4th arrondissement and on 5 November as the president of the electoral college of Charente.

Vice Admiral and peer of France during the July Revolution, inspector general of the French Navy for the 2nd and 5th arrondissements in 1832, grand officer of the Legion of Honor on 22 April 1834, Grand Cross of the Order on 22 June 1841, Admiral Jurien was later made part of the 2nd section of the General Staff of the French Navy.

He was the father of another French admiral, Edmond Jurien de la Gravière.

He died in Paris on 14 January 1849.

== Sources ==
- Mullié, Charles. Biographie des célébrités militaires des armées de terre et de mer de 1789 à 1850. "Pierre Roch Jurien de La Gravière." 1852.
- Kuntz, Monique & al. Hommes et femmes célèbres de l'Allier. Bonneton: Paris. 1995.
