= Sané =

Sané is a surname. Notable persons with this surname include:

- Abdoulaye Sané (born 1992), Senegalese footballer
- Ibou Sané (born 2005), Senegalese footballer
- Ibrahima Sané (born 1989), Senegalese footballer
- Ismaila Sané (born 1956), Senegalese musician
- Jacques-Noël Sané (1740–1831), French naval engineer
- Landing Sané (born 1990), French basketball player
- Leroy Sané (born 1996), German footballer, son of Souleymane
- Ludovic Sané (born 1987), Senegalese footballer
- Pape Sané (born 1990), Senegalese footballer
- Sadibou Sané (born 2004), Senegalese footballer
- Salif Sané (born 1990), Senegalese footballer
- Souleymane Sané (born 1961), Senegalese footballer, father of Leroy
- Tidiane Sane (born 1985), Senegalese footballer
- Vieux Sané (born 1989), Senegalese footballer
