= Roux family (marine painters) =

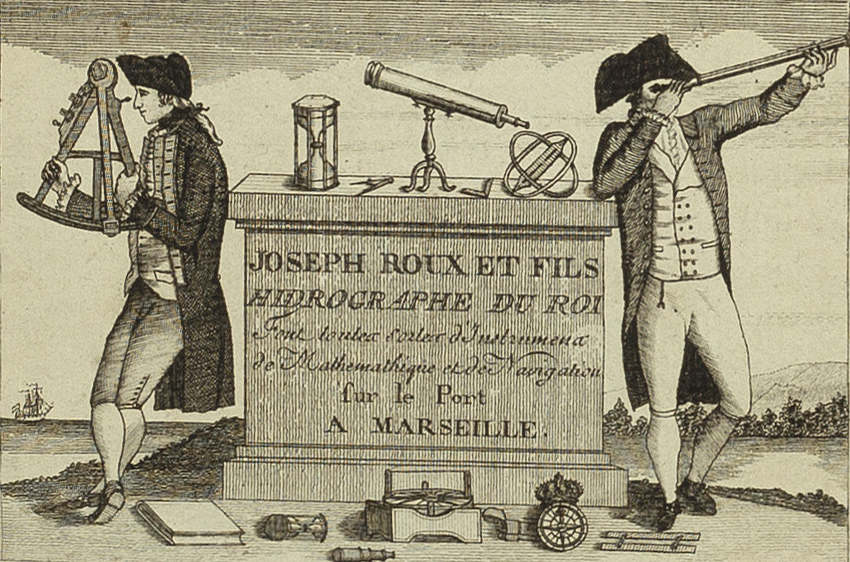
Image used in the hydrographic shop and on the trade cards of the Roux family

The Roux family of Marseille was a family of hydrographers and marine painters that specialized in ship portraits. While many generations were involved in the hydrographic business, it was really only three generations who painted and became known for their skill and accuracy in portraying a ship, making their work seem more like a photograph than a painting. The painters in the family were Joseph, Ange-Joseph Antoine, Mathieu-Antoine, Ursule-Josephine, François Joseph Frédéric and François Geoffroi.

== Joseph Roux ==
Joseph Roux was born in 1725 in Marseille, France to Joseph Roux, who worked as a hydrographer, and Magdaleine Senequier. He took over the family business and became a hydrographer like his father, "in the course of which he published, manufactured, and sold a wide assortment of charts, navigational instruments, and related nautical gear." It was probably around the mid-18th century when Joseph earned the title of "Hydrographe du Roi" meaning Hydrographer to the King. In 1764, Joseph published a folio of twelve Mediterranean charts which were used for a number of years after their publication. Copies were even used on HMS Victory in 1803 and 1805, as well as on HMS Shannon. Joseph was also known to paint, though not as frequently as his son or grandchildren. Two such works, oil paintings titled Bonhomme Richard vs Serapis and Naval Engagement between a British East Indiaman and a French Warship, exist at the Peabody Essex Museum and showcase Joseph's skill as a painter. Joseph died in 1793 in Marseille.

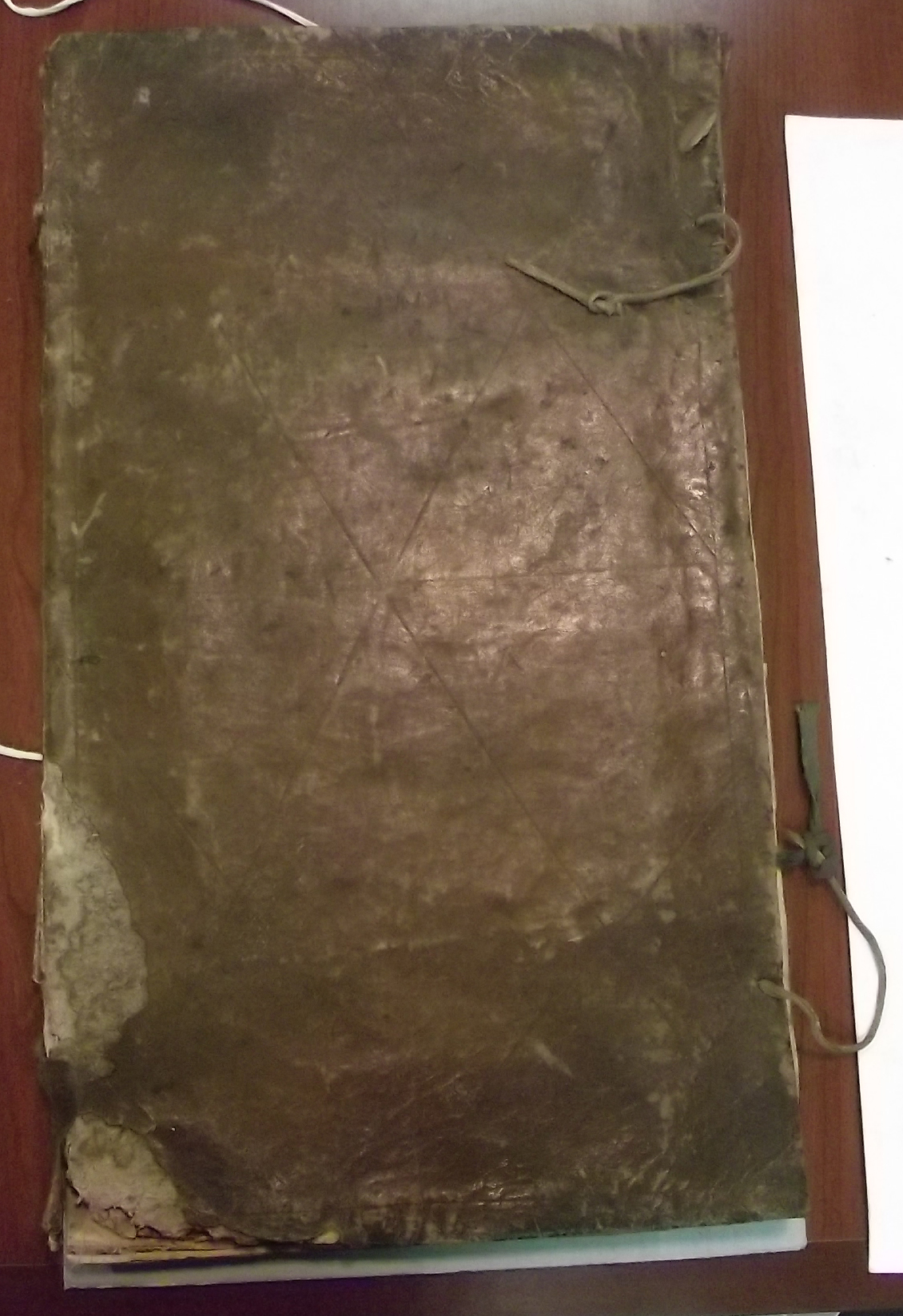
Folio of twelve Mediterranean charts published by Joseph Roux in 1764

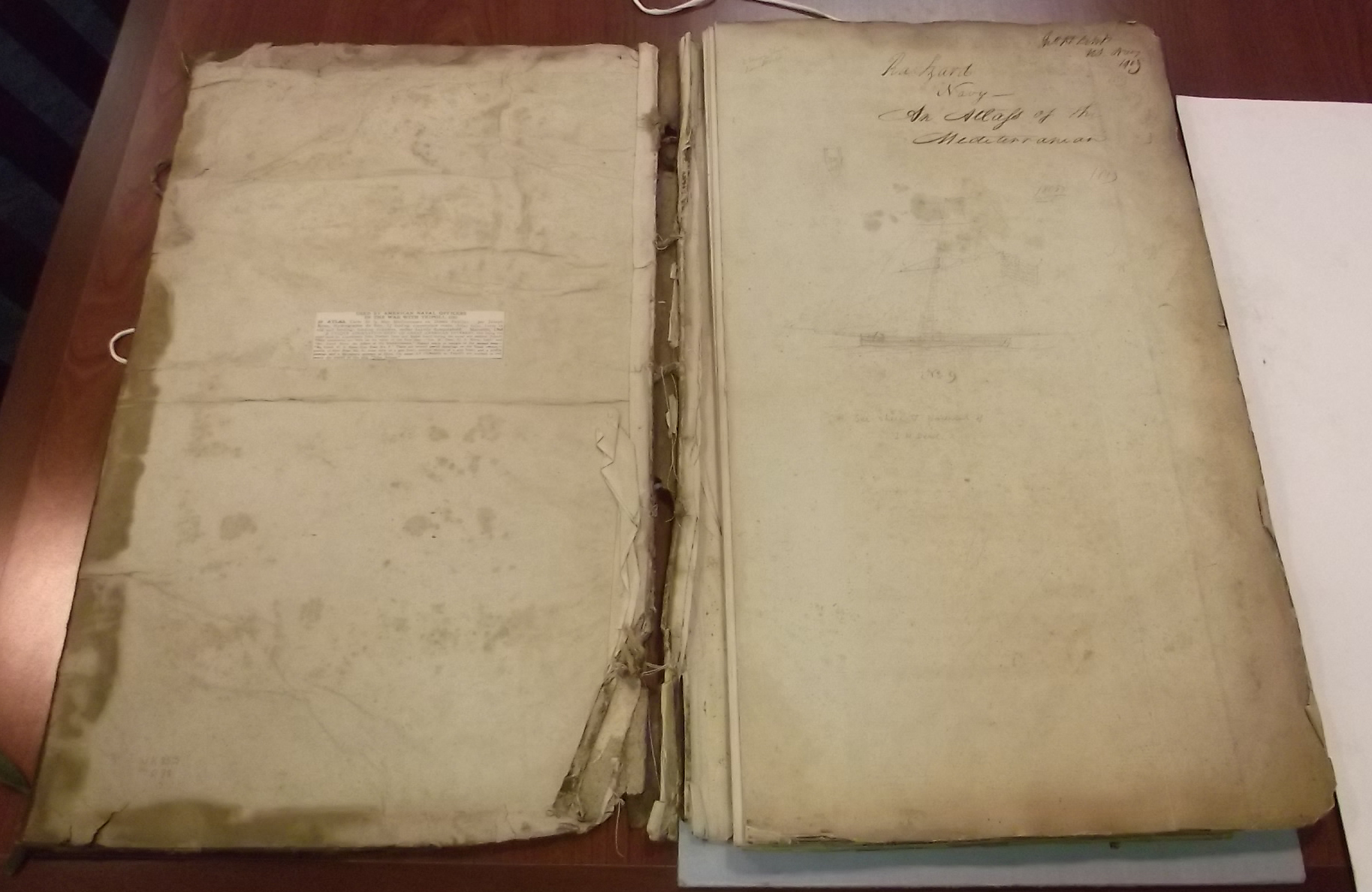
Inside cover of Joseph Roux's folio of Mediterranean charts

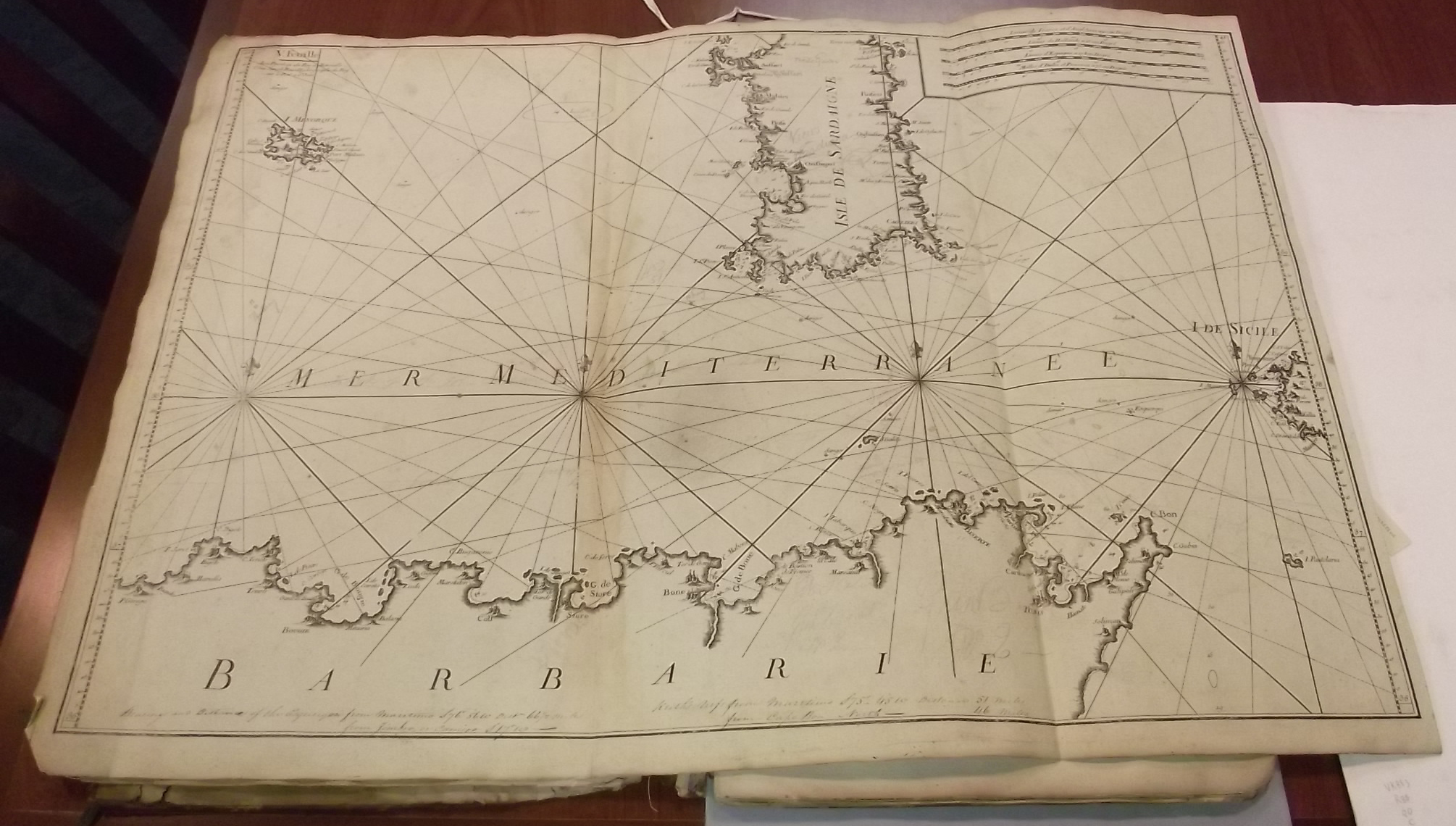
One of the charts inside Joseph's folio

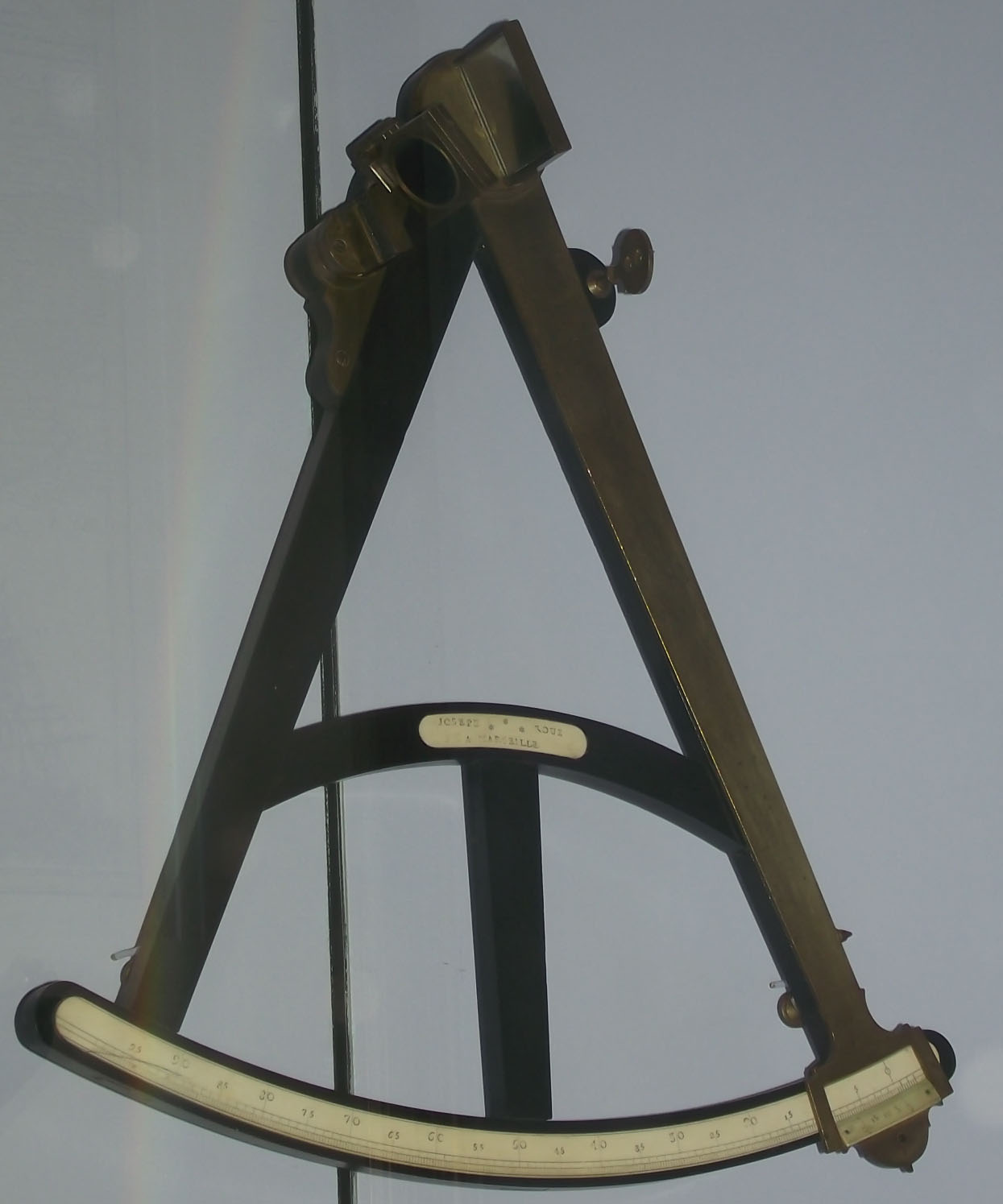
Octant made by Joseph Roux c. 1780

== Ange-Joseph Antoine Roux ==
Ange-Joseph Antoine Roux, who went by "Antoine Roux", was born March 5, 1765, in Marseille, France to Joseph Roux and Marie-Ursule Demoline. He grew up in his father's hydrographic shop where he most likely picked up a great deal of nautical knowledge. The earliest known work by Antoine is a sketch from 1787, signed and dated, showing pieces of a man-of-war. Later sketchbooks are in the collection at the Peabody Essex Museum. Antoine became famous for his ship portraits and shipowners and captains were eager to entrust him with the task of creating paintings for their ships. He became very popular for the accuracy in his ship portraits and the way he made them seem alive.

For the most part Antoine's style remained the same, especially when it came to hulls and rigging, which he depicted with excellent skill. One area that changed was his depiction of water. It was around 1805-1806 that he stopped illustrating waves so formally with high-crested wavelets, except in the instance of rough seas, and replaced them with softer and more natural looking waves. There was also a discernible pattern in regards to his signature:

1790s-1802 "fait par Ante [or "Antne"] Roux"

1801-1830 "Ante [or "Antne"] Roux à Marseille"

1825-1835 "Ante [or "Antne"] Roux père à Marseille"

Antoine died April 20, 1835, from Cholera. He continued to paint and work in the hydrographic shop up until his death.

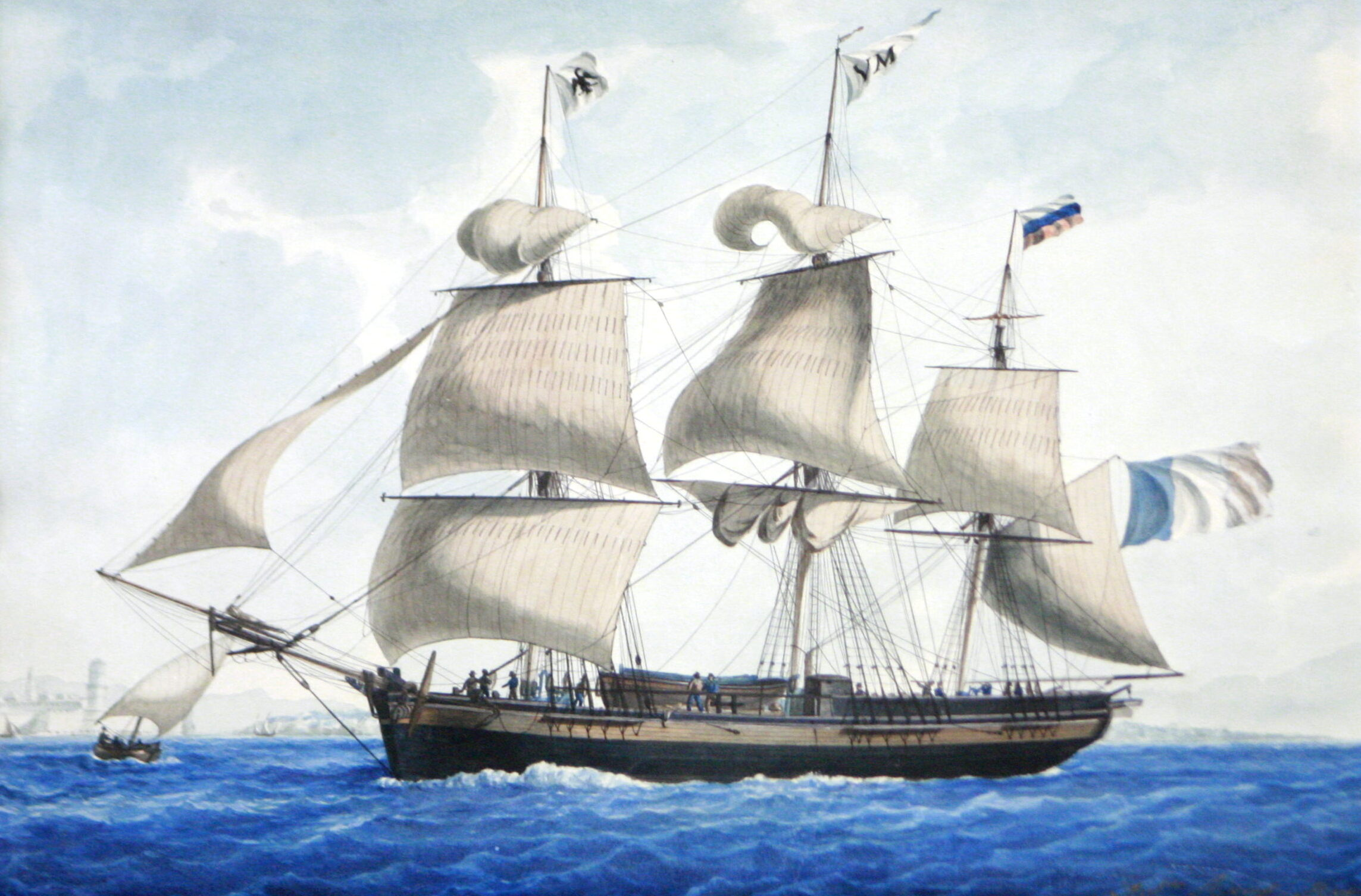
Jean-Baptiste de Havre in Marseille Harbor in the Marseille Naval Museum

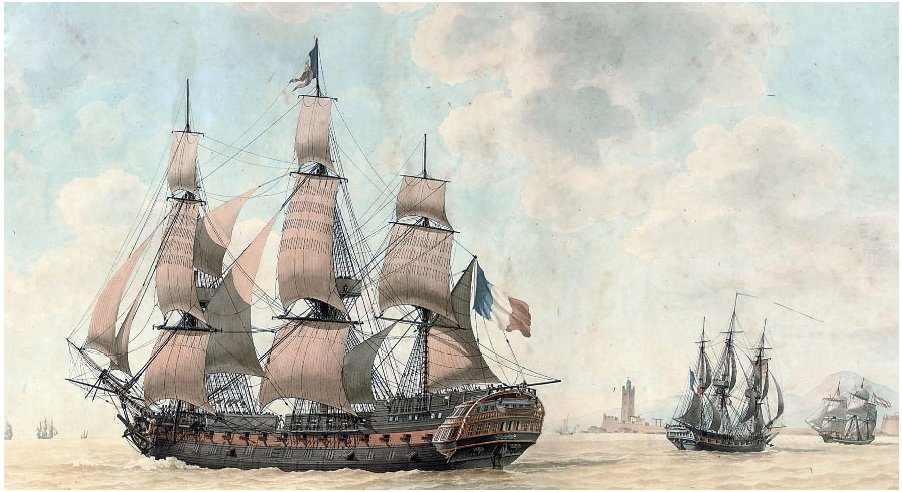
The Mont-Blanc off Marseille, with two merchantmen in the background

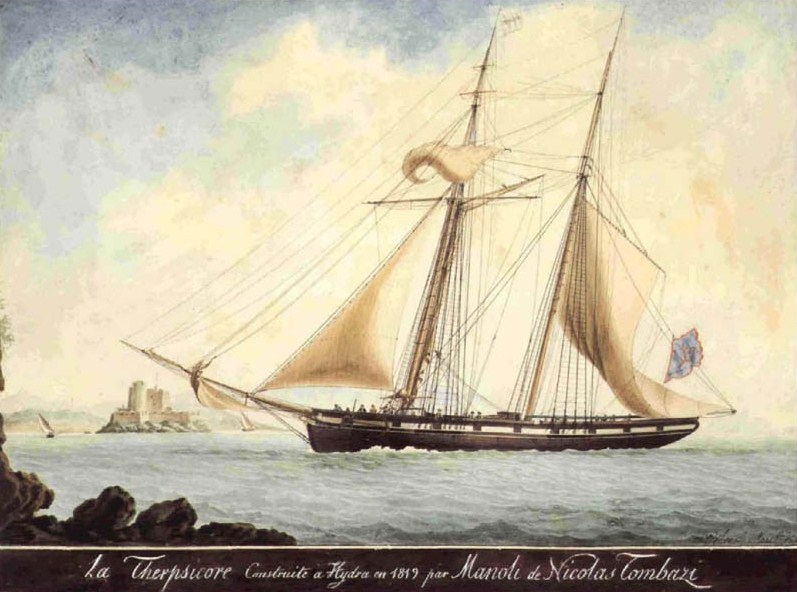
Schooner Therpiscore (1820) at the Benaki Museum

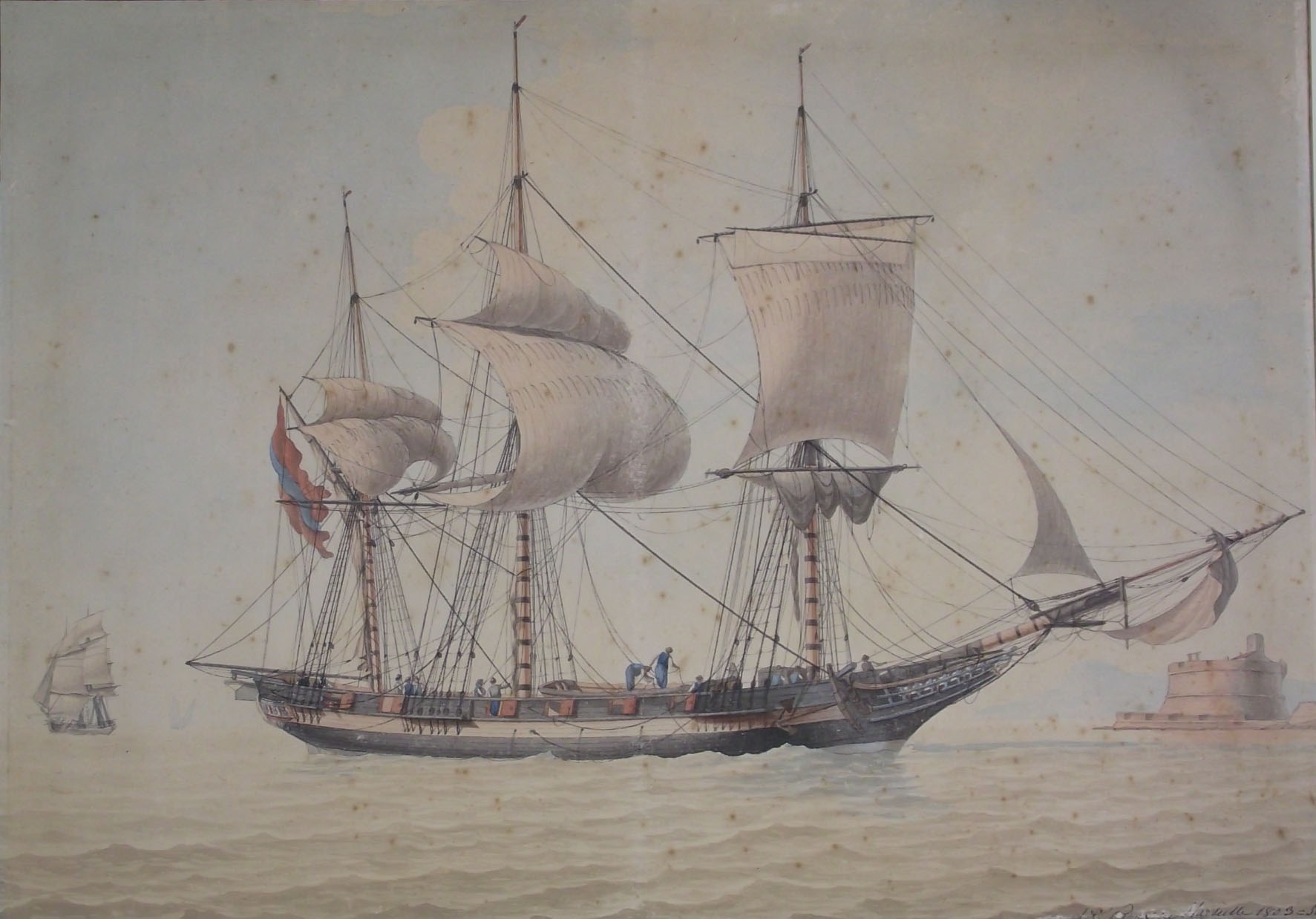
Bella Aurora, a Greek polacca off Marseille (1803)

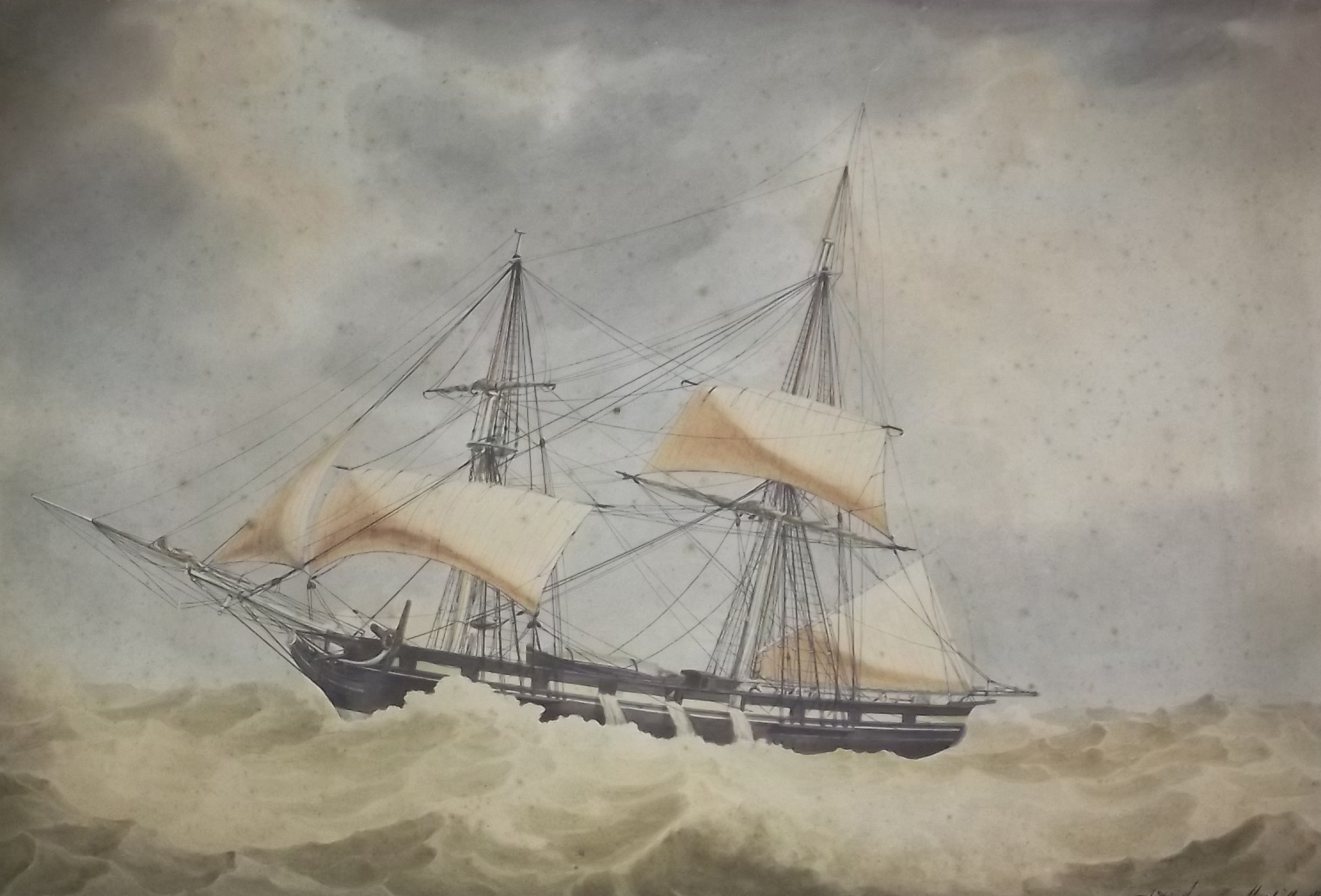
Le Louis Assailly D'un Coup de Vent (1825) at the Mariners' Museum

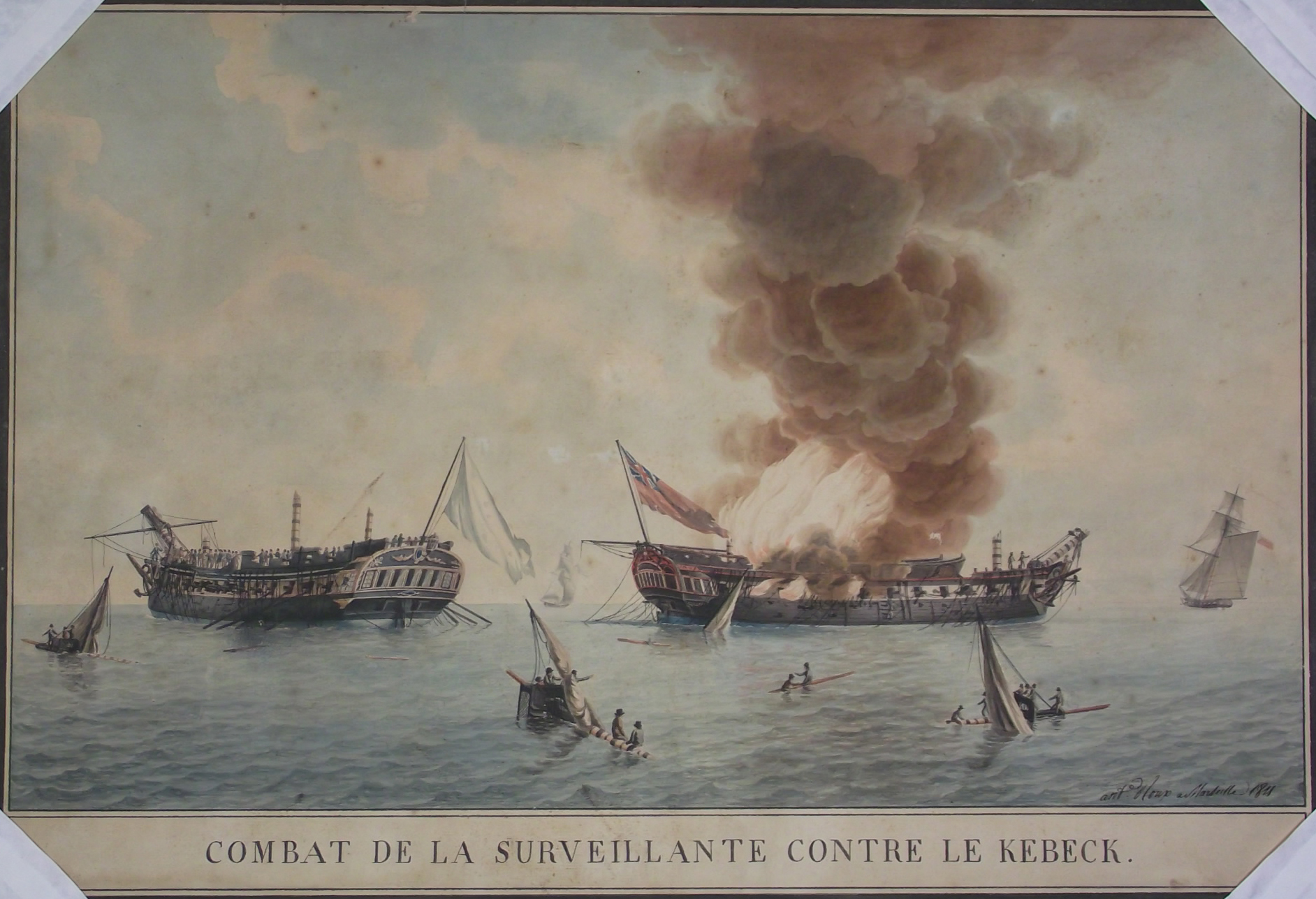
Combat de la Survellante Contre le Kebeck (1811) at the Mariners' Museum

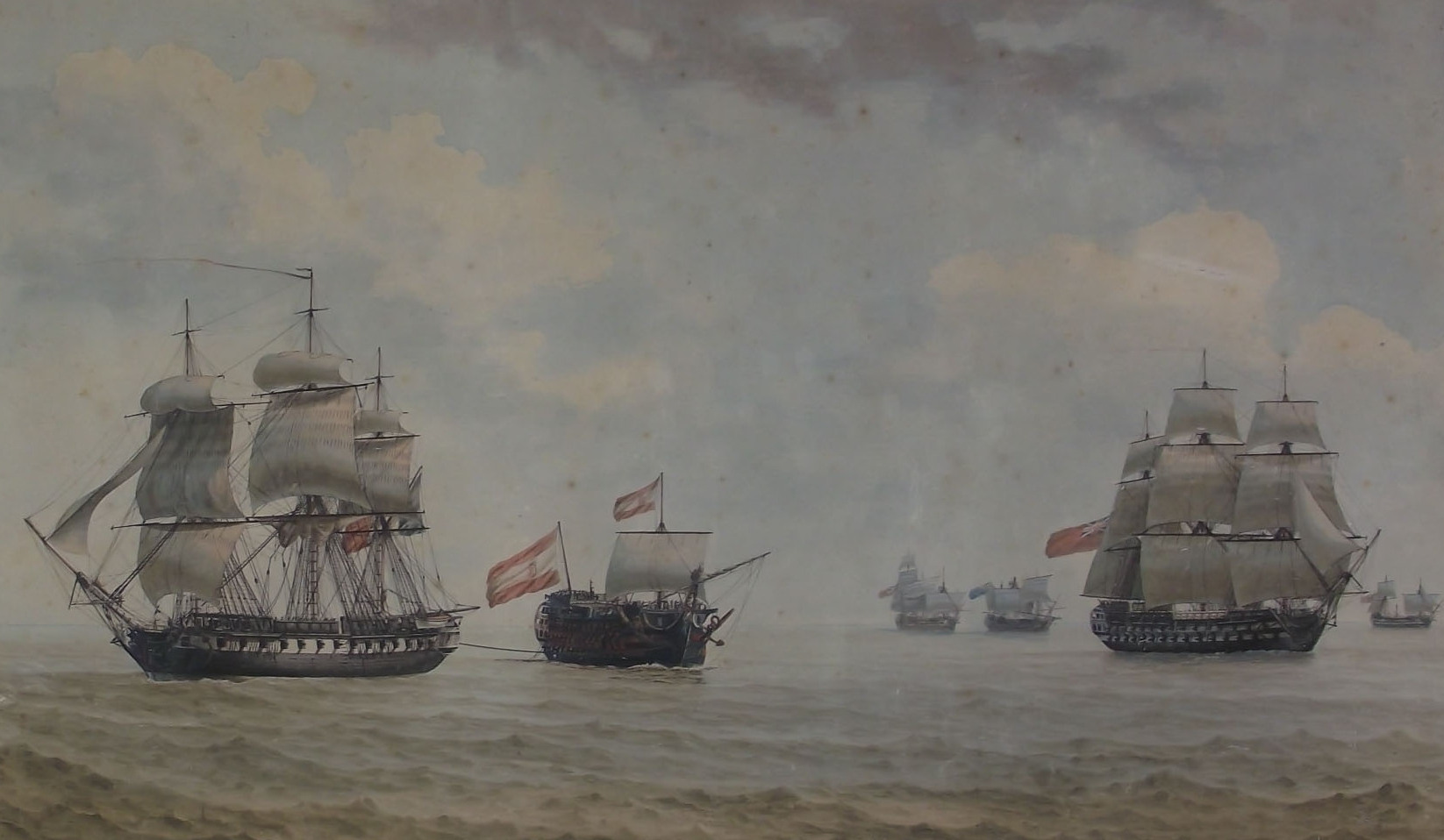
La Thémis Comandee (1809) at the Mariners' Museum

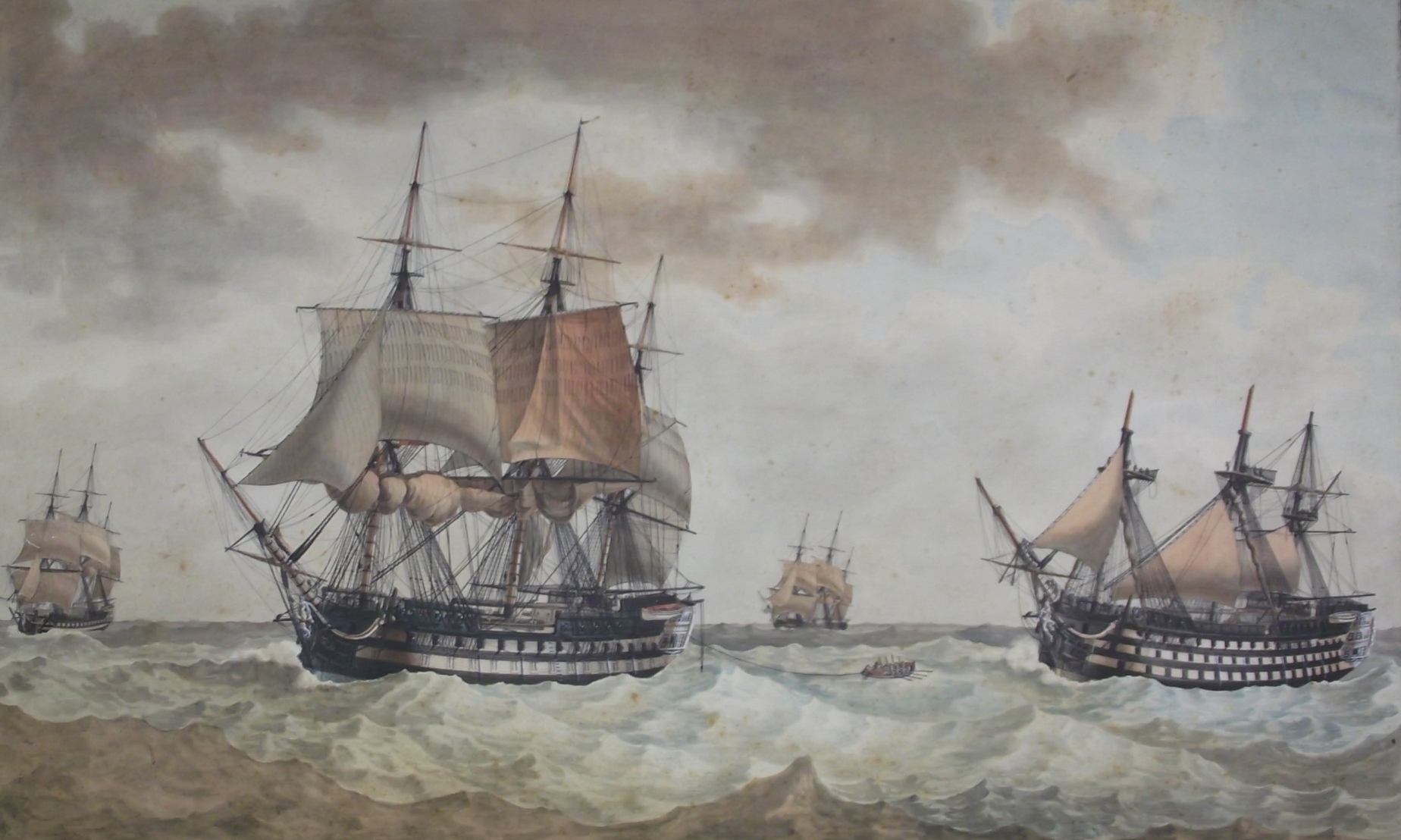
Le Magnanime Towing Commerce de Paris (1809) at the Mariners' Museum

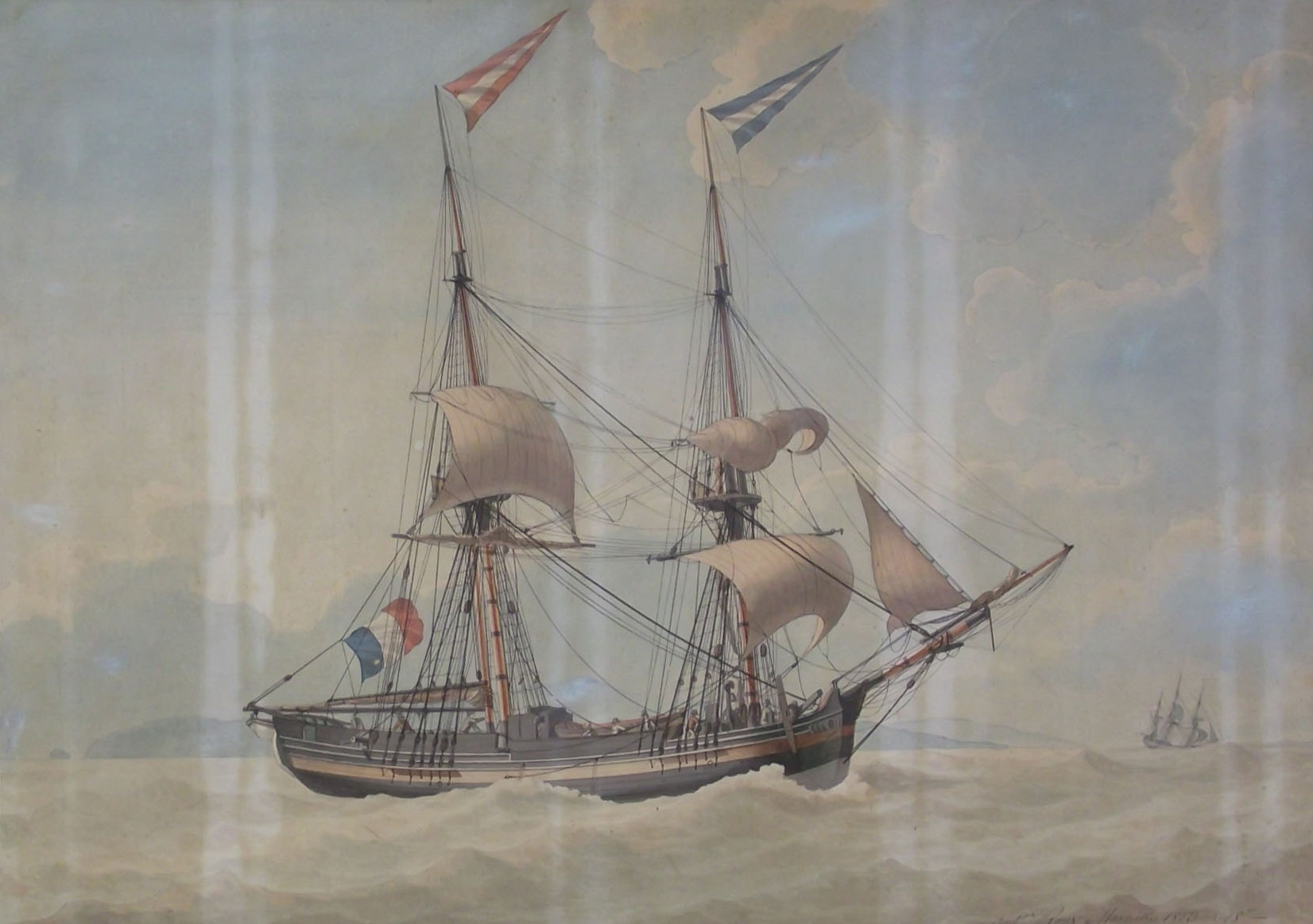
French Merchantman (1803) at the Mariners' Museum

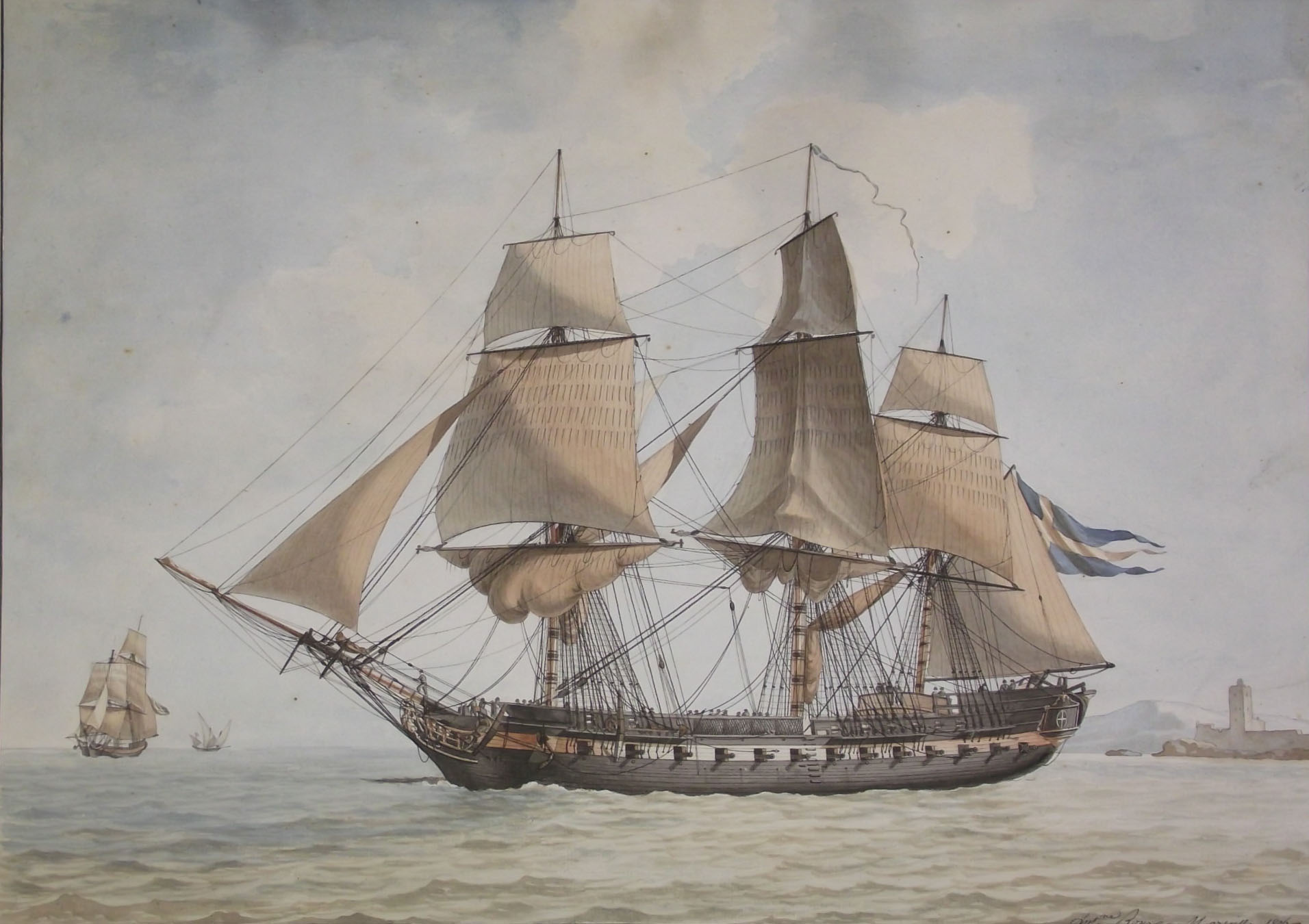
Camilla (1806) at the Mariners' Museum

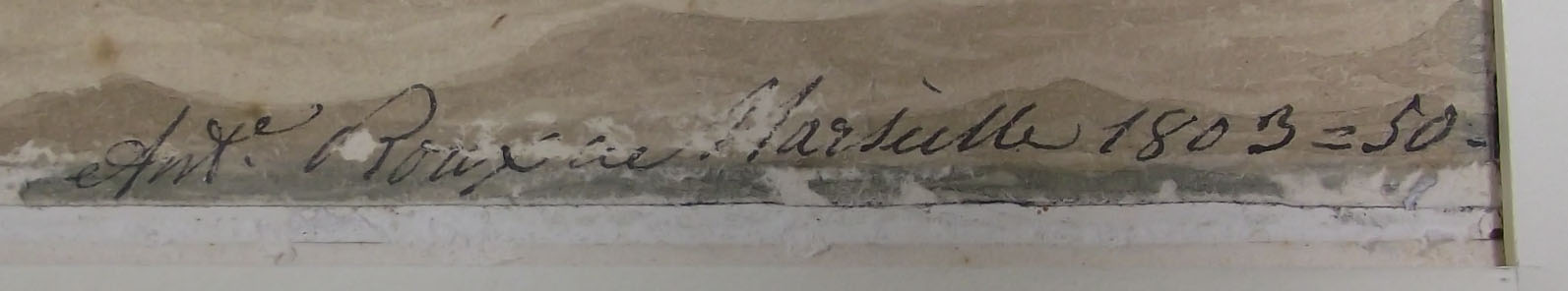
Example of Antoine's signature, taken from the watercolor Sailing ship at Marseille (1803)

== Mathieu-Antoine Roux ==
Mathieu-Antoine Roux, who like his father went by "Antoine Roux", was born in Marseille, France on May 20, 1799, to the elder Antoine and Rose Elizabeth Gabrielle Catelin. He would be the first of four children to the couple. Antoine also became a painter, although he is not considered to be quite as skilled as his brothers or father were. He ended up taking over the hydrographic business of an uncle only a short distance from the one his father ran. He used the same image his grandfather had introduced in his hydrographic shop and that became associated with the Roux family, that of the two little men, one using a telescope and the other using an octant. Upon Antoine's death on January 26, 1872, his son François Antoine Roux, nicknamed "Tonin", took over the hydrographic shop. To distinguish his paintings from those of his father, Antoine's signatures were very clear. He often signed "Ante Roux fils ainé", which can be translated as "Antoine Roux eldest son".

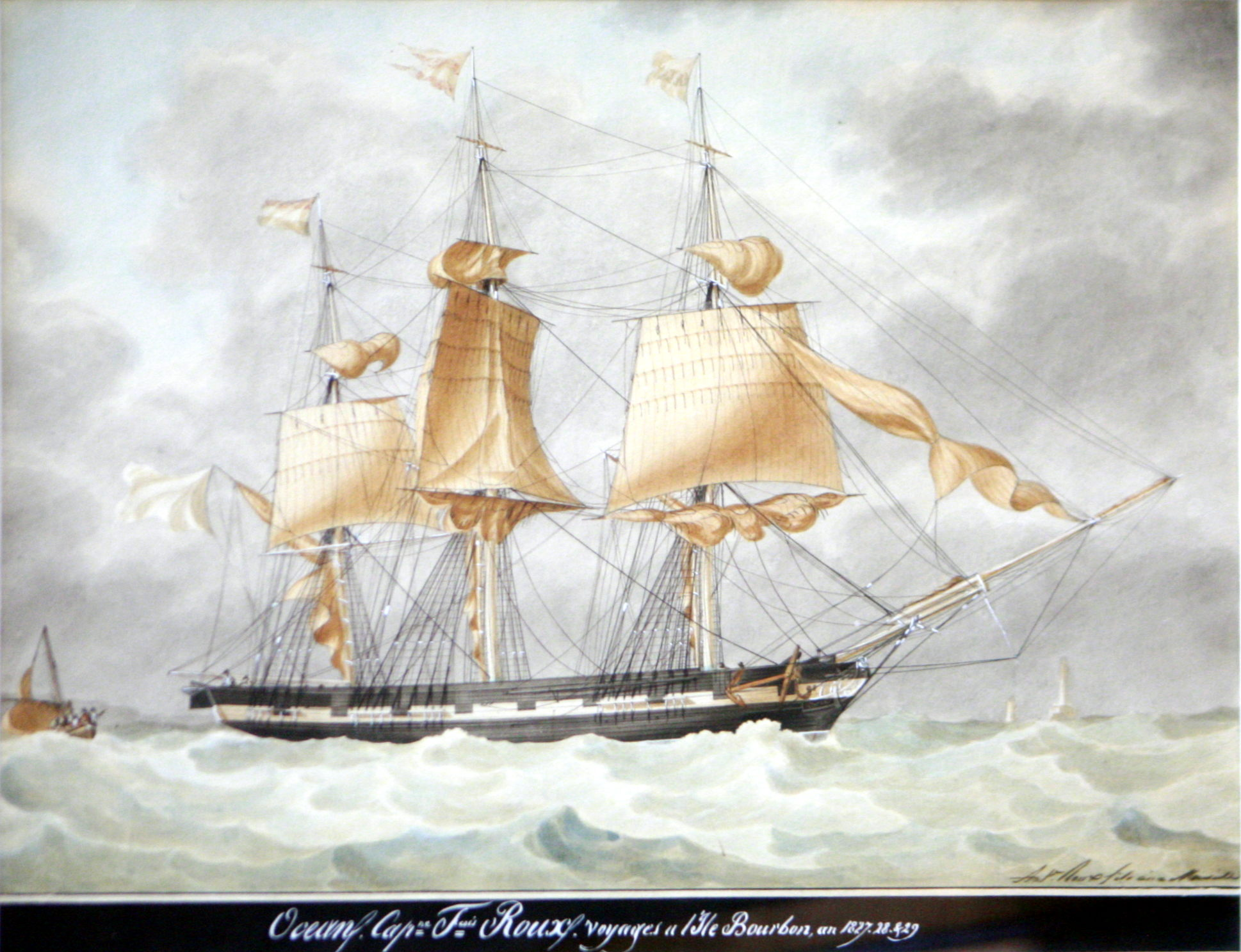
Ocean La Reunion at the Marseille Naval Museum

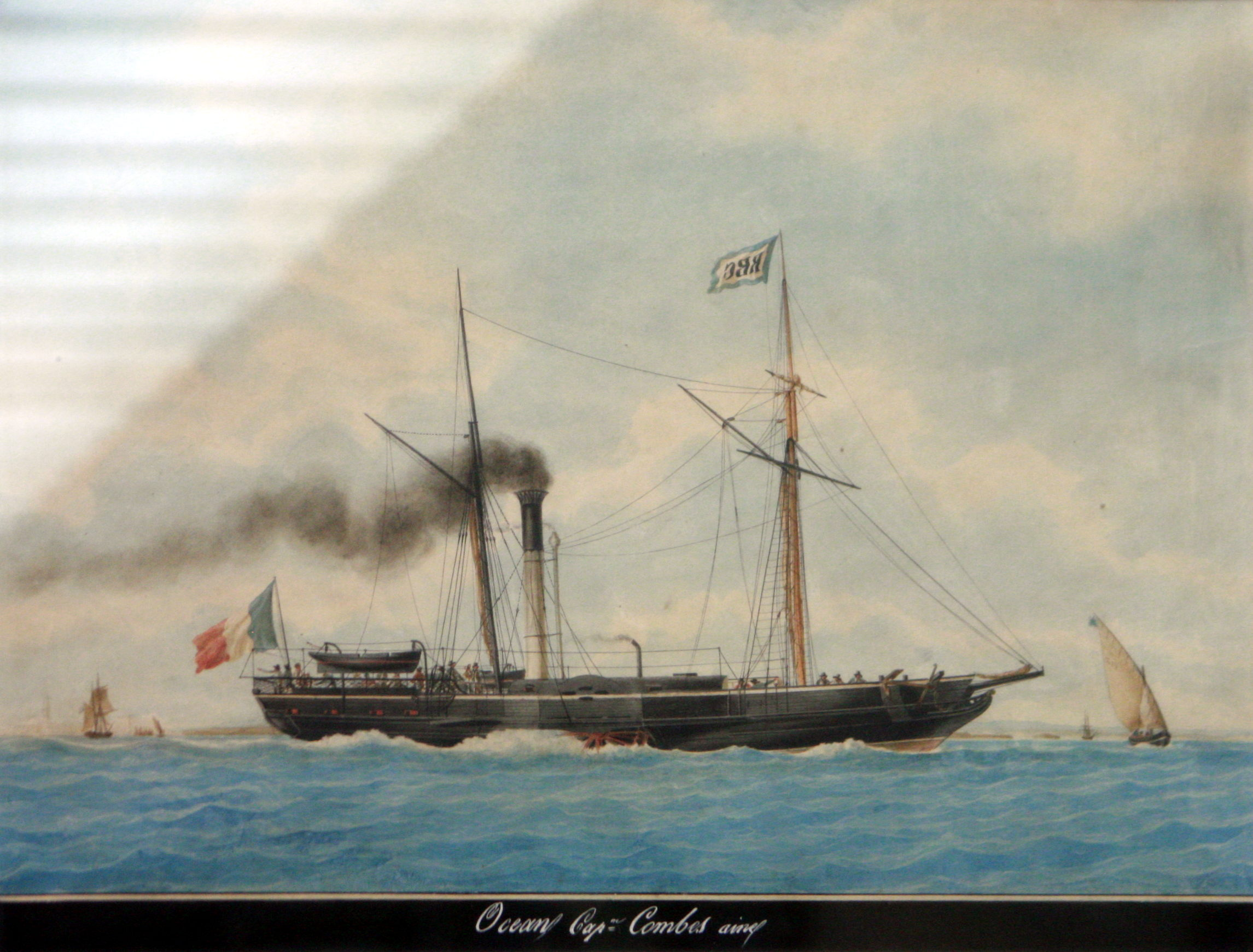
Ocean at the Marseille Naval Museum

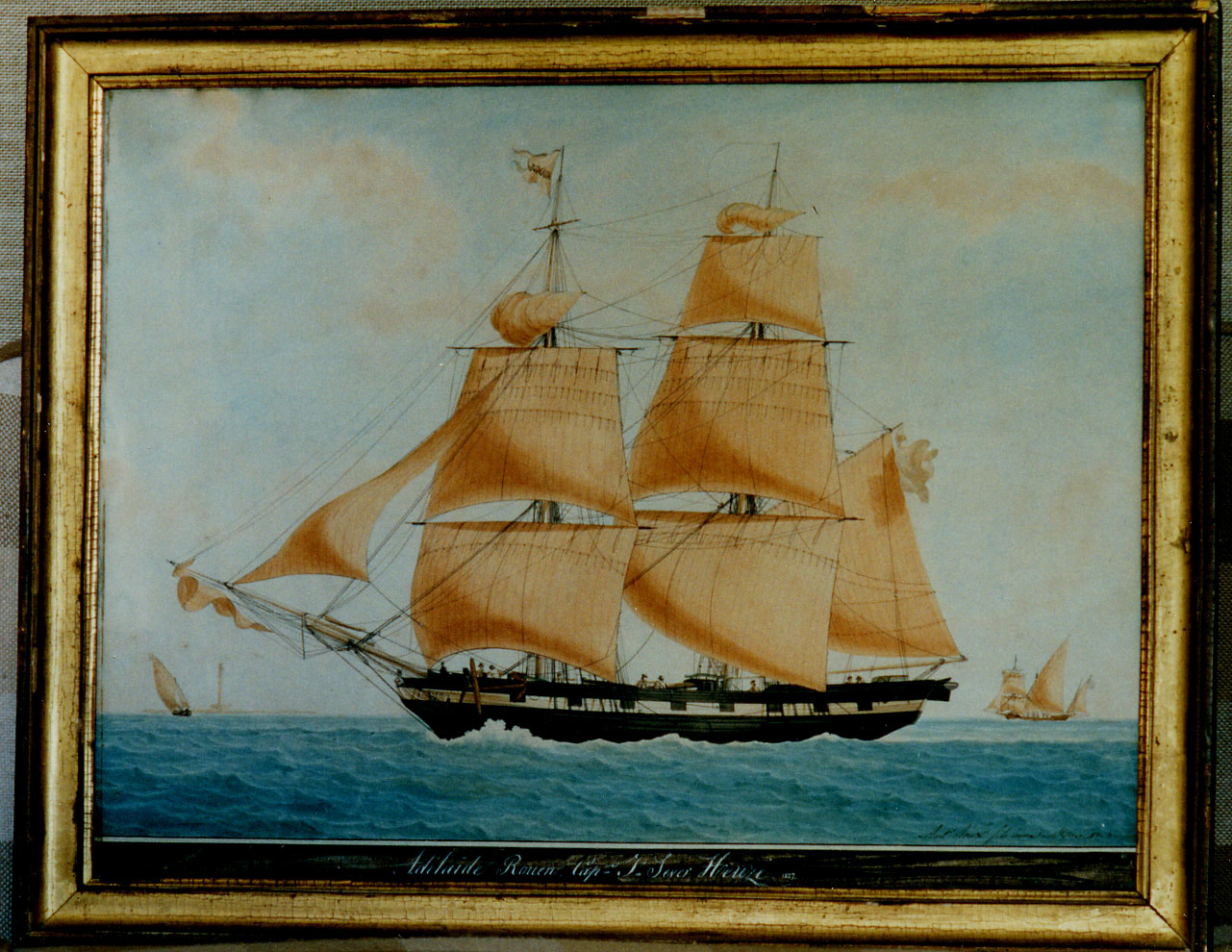
Adelaïde (1827), capitaine Jean Sever Heuzé

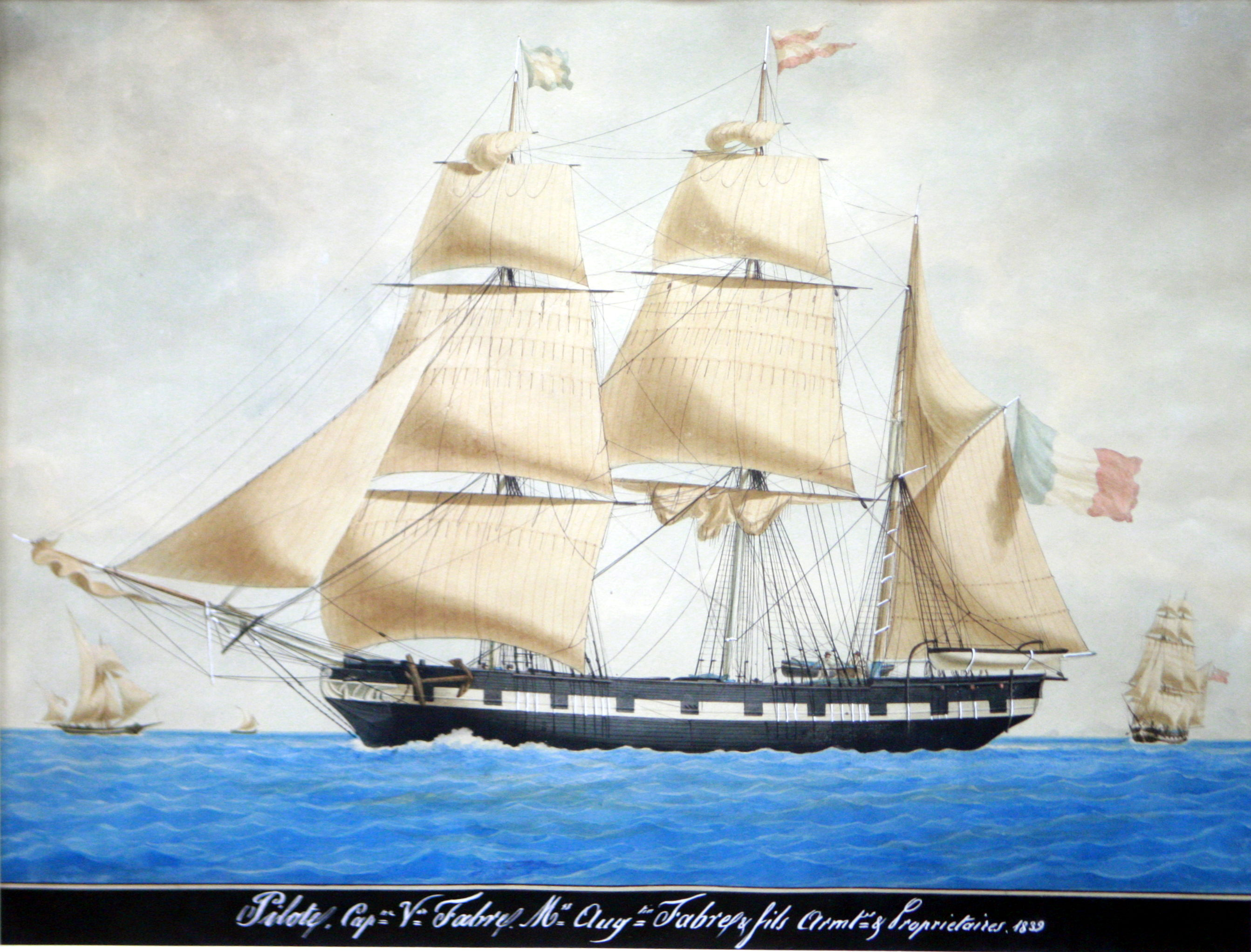
Pilote at the Marseille Naval Museum

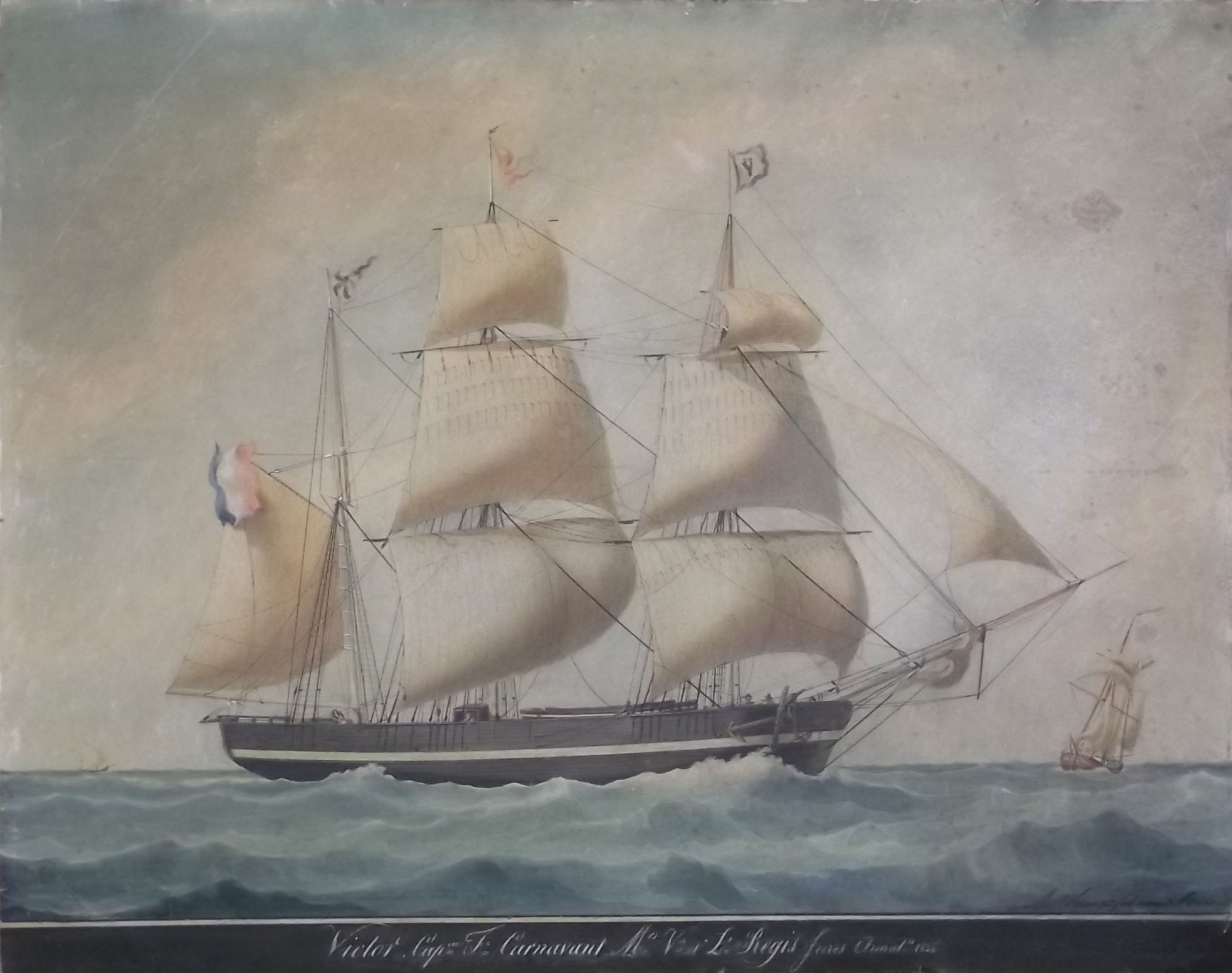
Victor (1835) at the Mariners' Museum

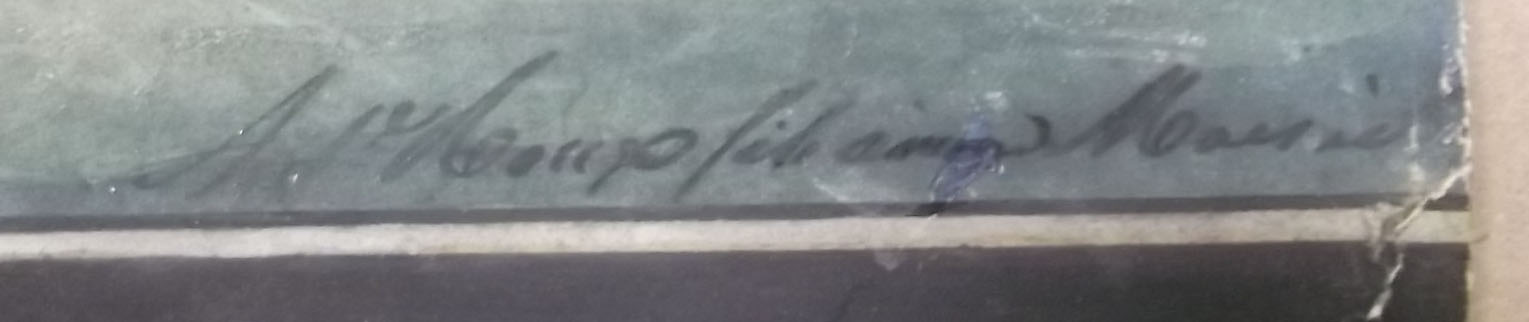
Antoine's signature from his watercolor Victor (1835)it says "Ante Roux fils aine Marseille"

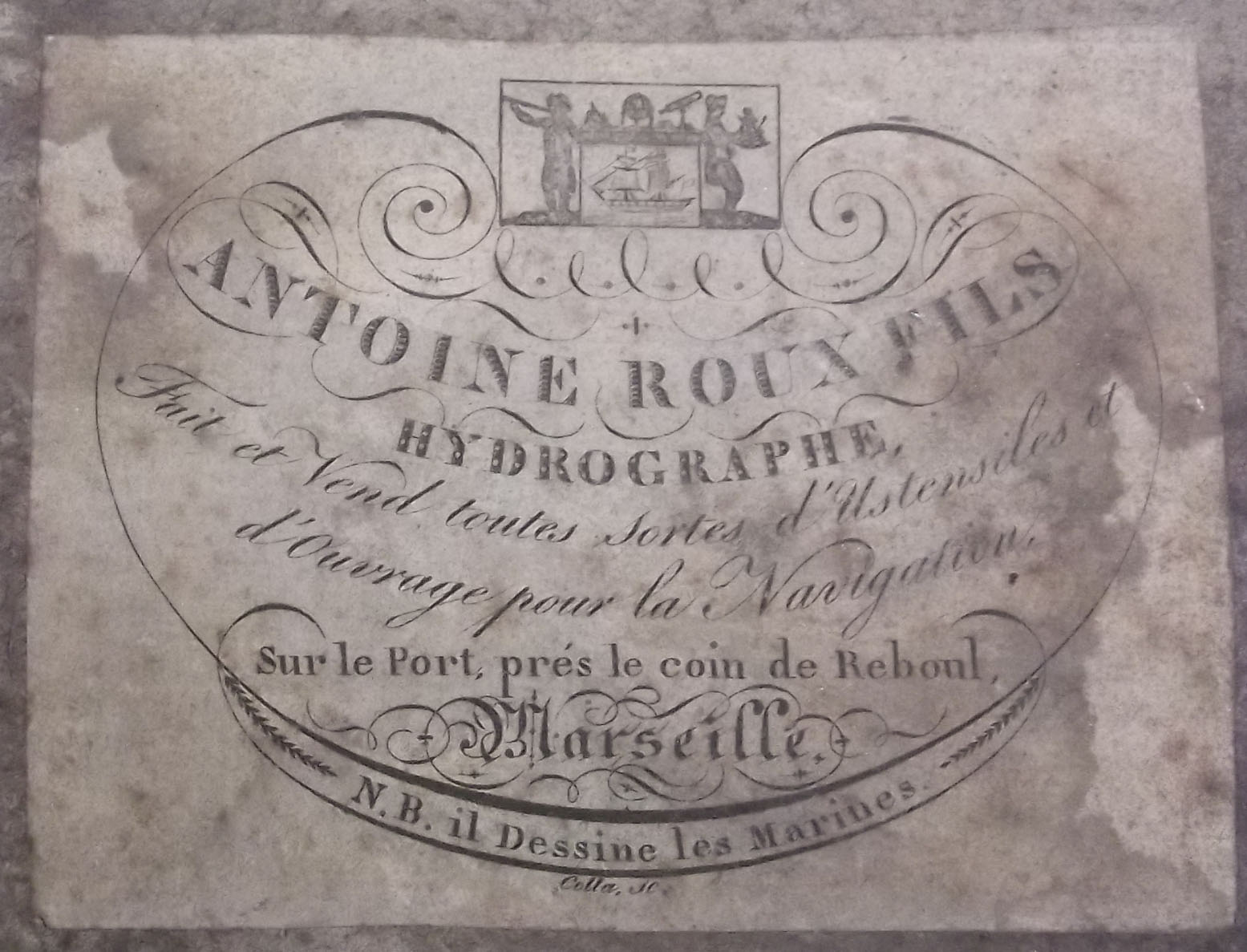
Antoine's trade card on the back of Victor (1835)

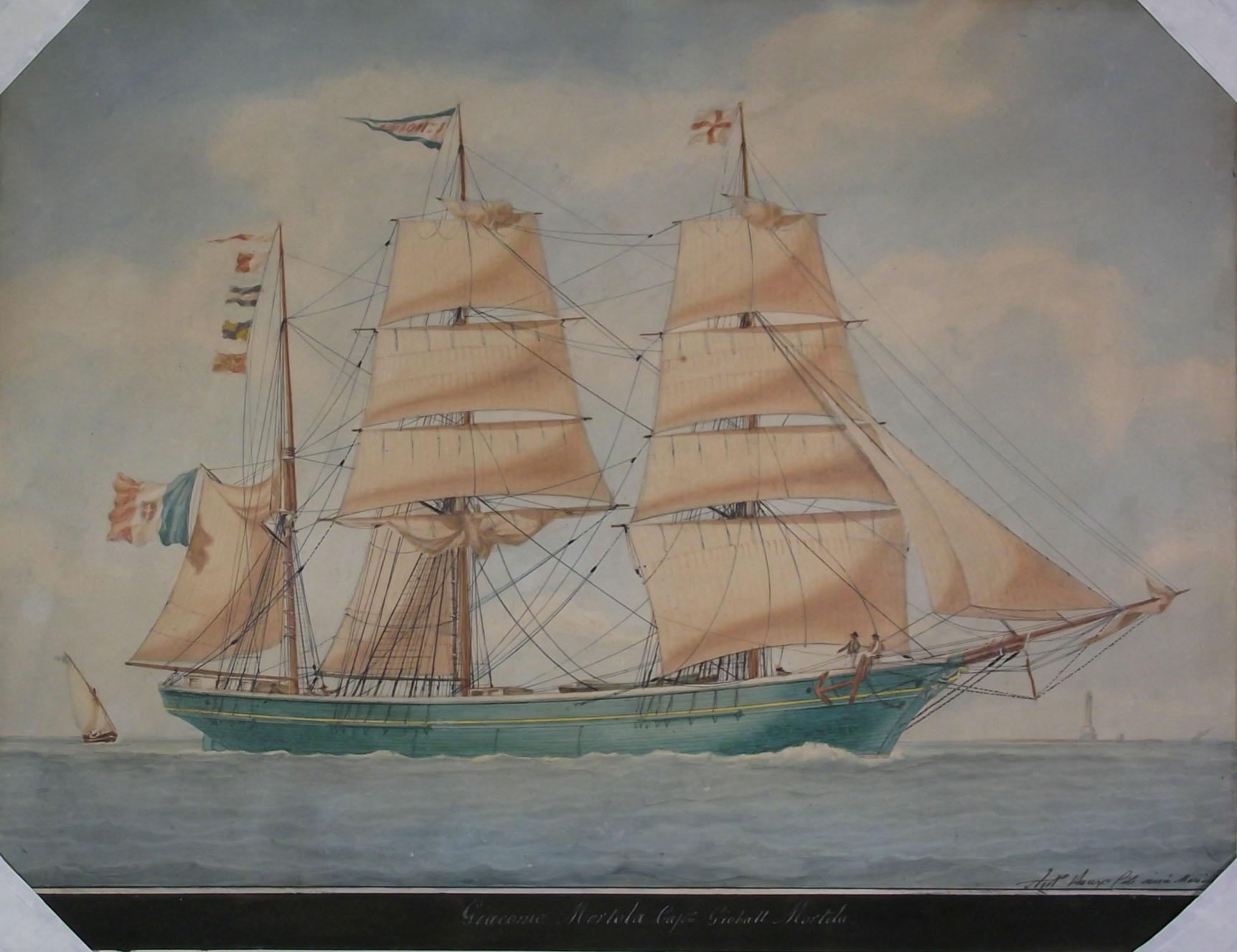
Giacomo Mortola at the Mariners' Museum

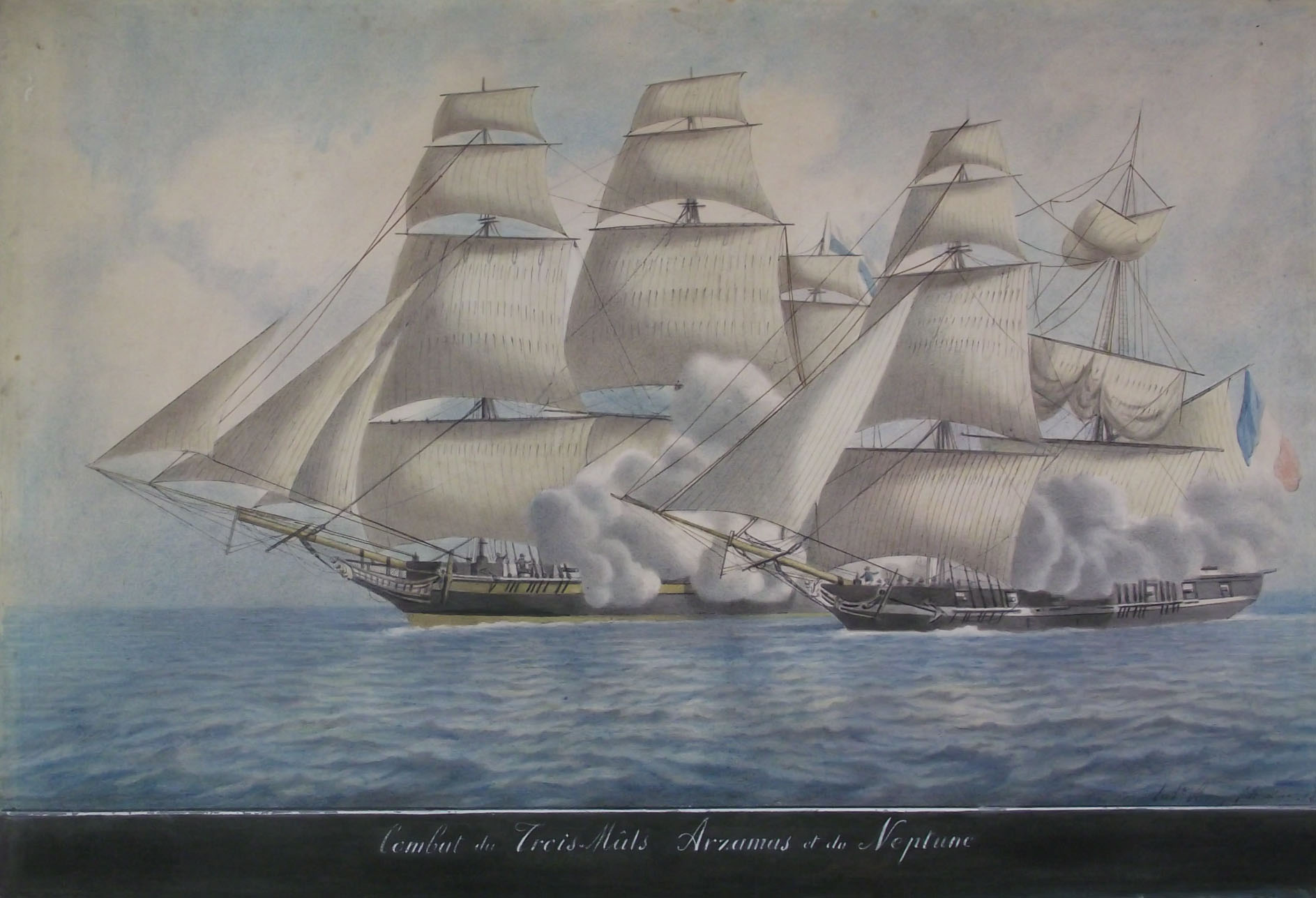
Combat du Trois Mats Arzamas et de Neptue (c. 1851–1859) at the Mariners' Museum

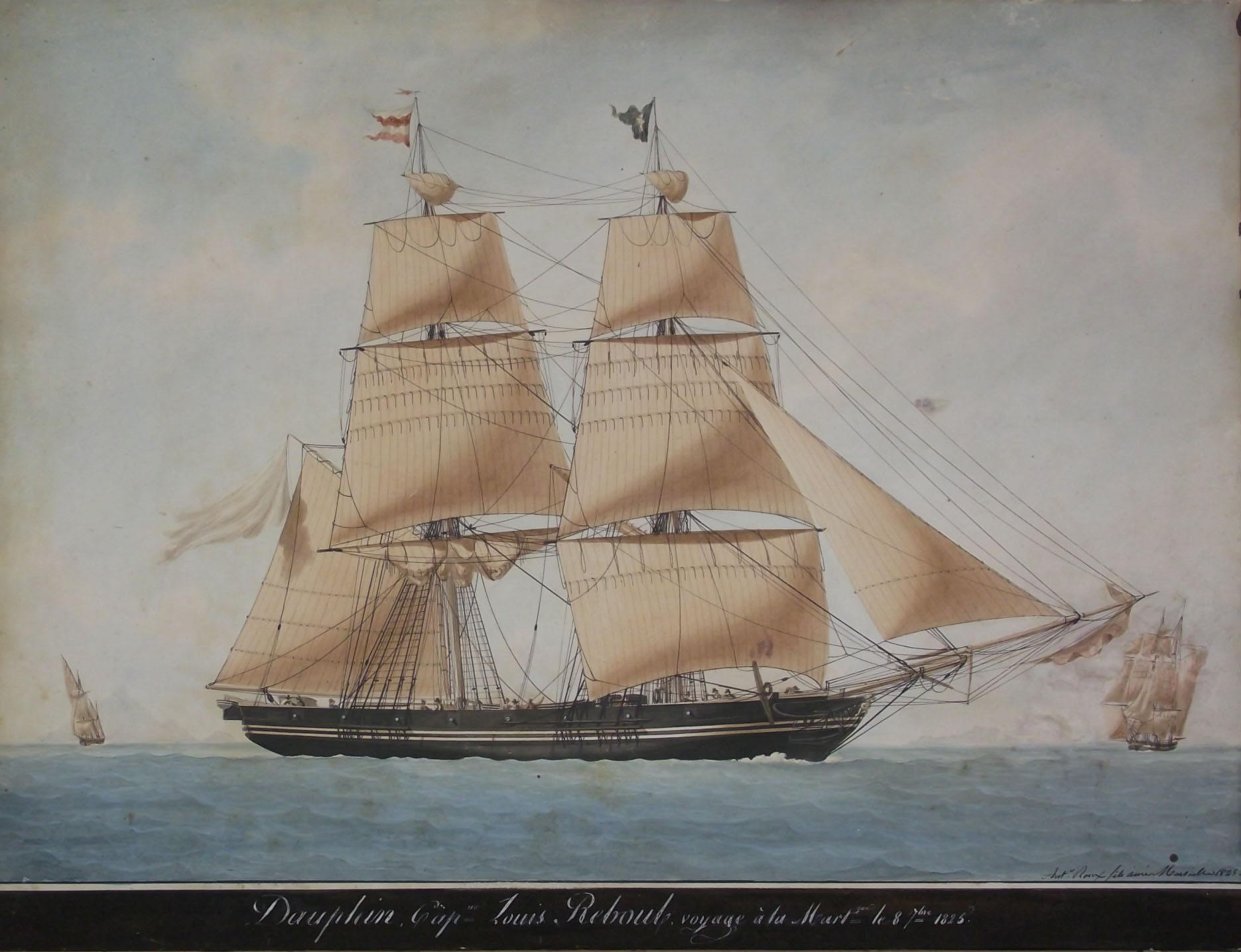
Dauphin (1825) at the Mariners' Museum

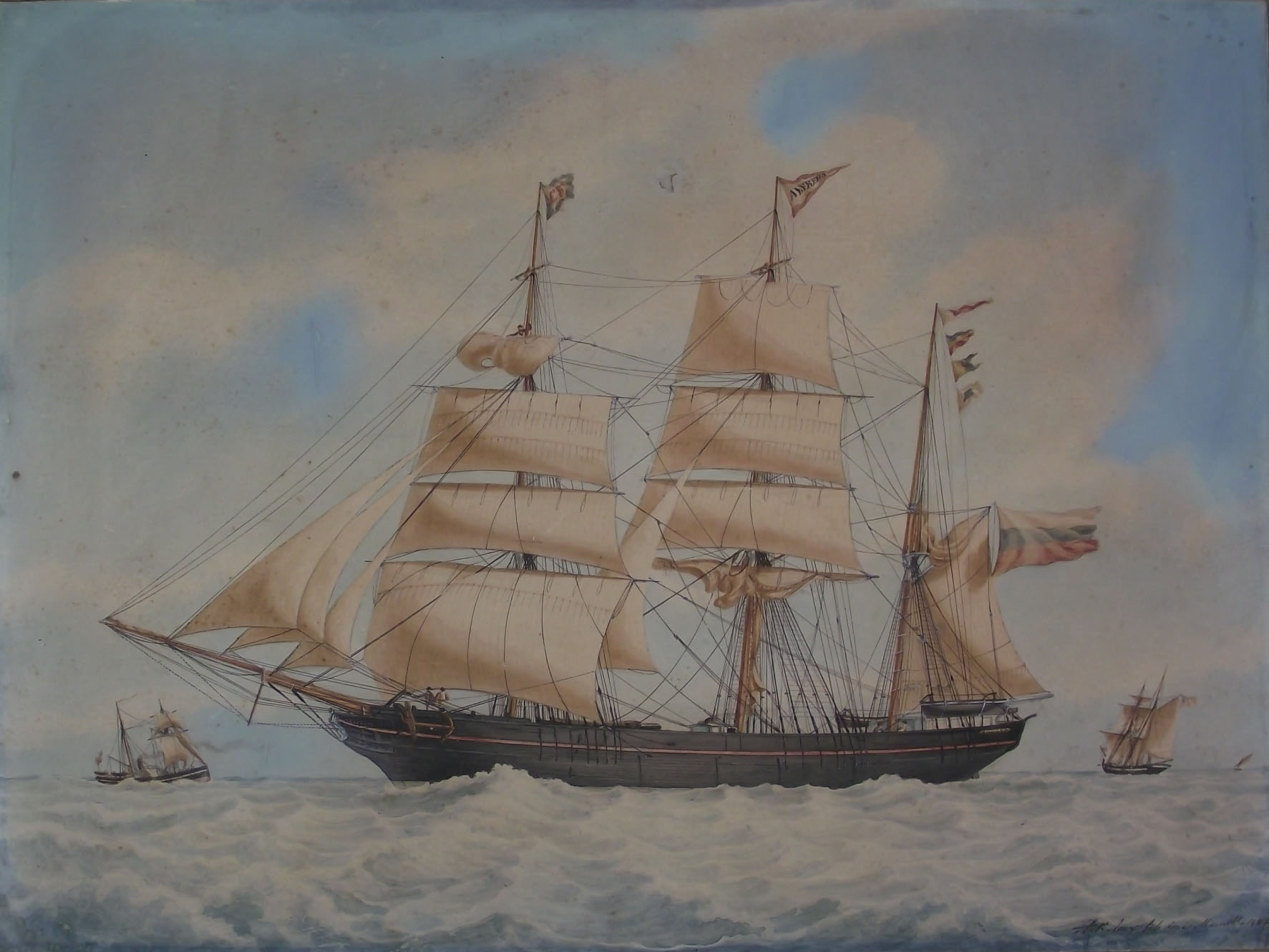
Alfred (1859) at the Mariners' Museum

== Ursule-Josephine Roux ==
Ursule Josephine was the second child of Antoine and Rose; born in 1801 in Marseille. Very little is known about her and she did not paint nearly as frequently as her brothers. One painting, titled View of Marseille Harbor is owned by the Peabody Essex Museum. As of 1924, two others were privately owned by a gentleman named Edouard Gaubert, who knew the family. They are titled L’Entrée du Port de Marseille and La Calanque de l’Ourse.

== François Joseph Frédéric Roux ==
François Joseph Frédéric, who went by Frédéric, was the third child of Antoine and Rose and was born in 1805 in Marseille. Frédéric was already painting for money at the age of 17 in 1822, clearly showing a great skill for his craft. As a young man, Frédéric went to Paris at the insistence of Carle and Horace Vernet (son and grandson of Joseph Vernet) to study at the Vernet studio. It was in Paris where he was commissioned by Admiral Jean-Baptiste Philibert Wilaumez to create 40 watercolors of the vessels on which he had served or been involved with. This set is now in the Musée de la Marine in Paris. Frédéric was also commissioned to make 23 watercolors dedicated to the Duc d'Orléans, Ferdinand Philippe, which were finished in 1831. It was around 1835 that Frédéric moved from Paris to Le Havre where he set up a hydrographic shop and painting business.

Frédéric did not solely devote himself to the hydrographic and painting business, but instead divided his time with adventures, traveling and generally enjoying the pleasures life had to offer. He ventured a few times back to Marseille, but spent the rest of his life in Havre, where he died in January 1870.

== François Geoffroi Roux ==
François Geoffroi, who went by François, was the fourth child of Antoine and Rose and was born on October 21, 1811, in Marseille. His talent brought him the attention of Carle and Horace Vernet, as it had his brother Frédéric, but he did not leave for Paris as his brother did. He stayed in Marseille where he eventually took over his father's hydrographic shop. François became famous for his skill in portraying a ship naturally, to almost make it appear as though one were looking at a photograph of a ship rather than a painting. He was so skilled that it was said that François had "assimilated the science of the ship as if he were both builder and sailor." Of particular interest was a series of watercolors he created between the late 1860s and 1882 that illustrated the "development of naval and merchant vessels since the last decade of the eighteenth century." These were given to the Louvre, but not all made it and so an exact count of how many were created is unknown. The Musée de la Marine currently owns 71. François died in Marseille on September 30, 1882.

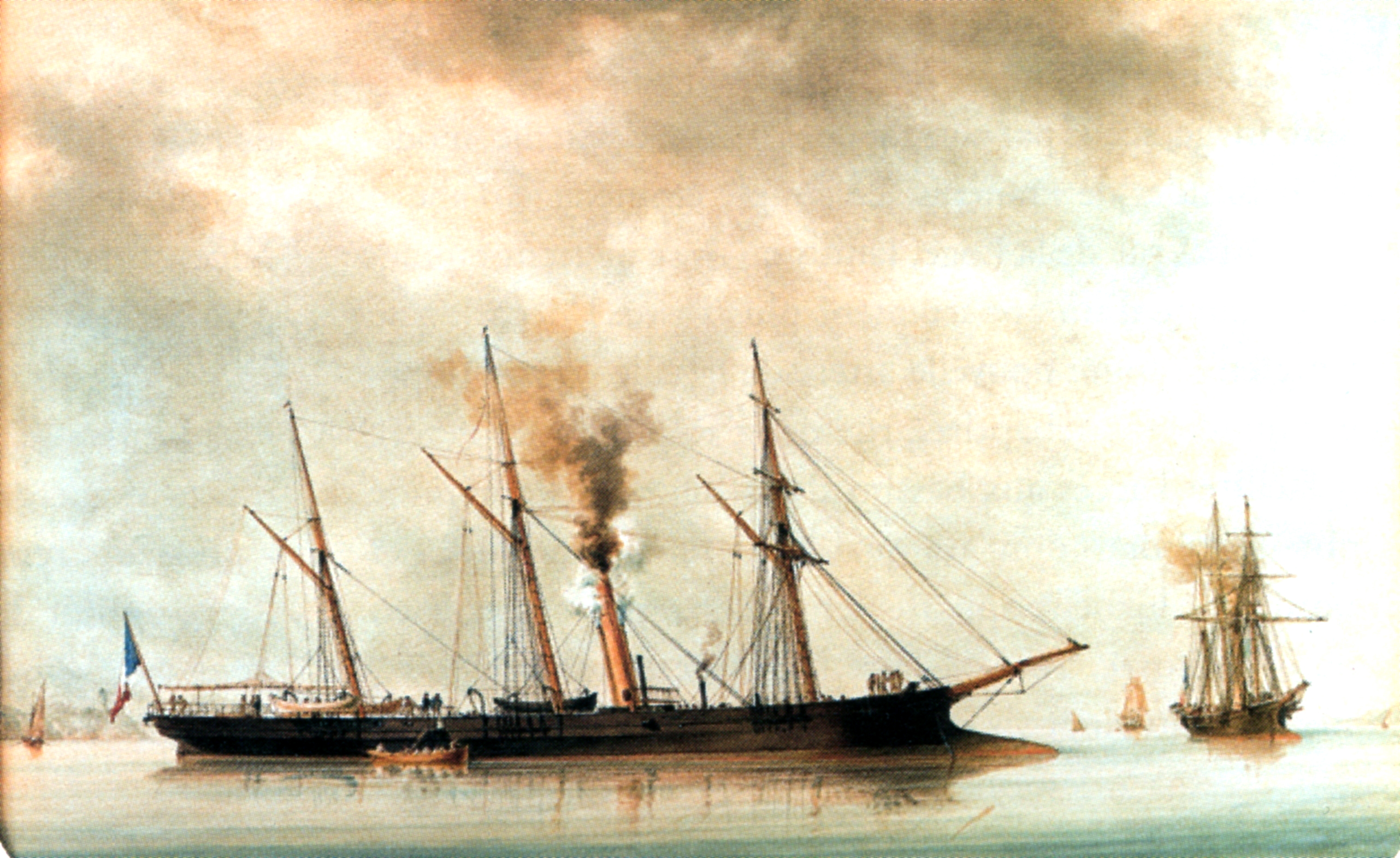
Le Renard (1846)

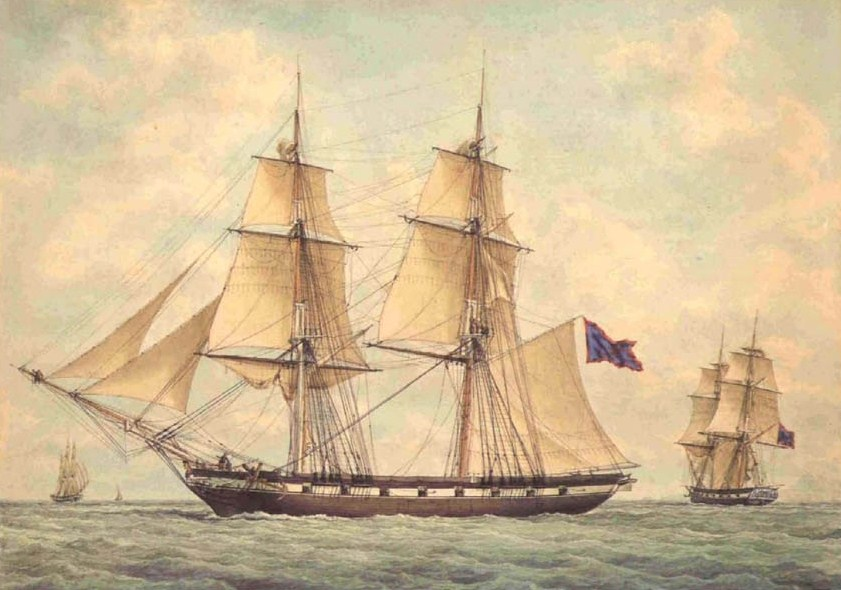
Greek brig Ares (1881) at the Benaki Museum

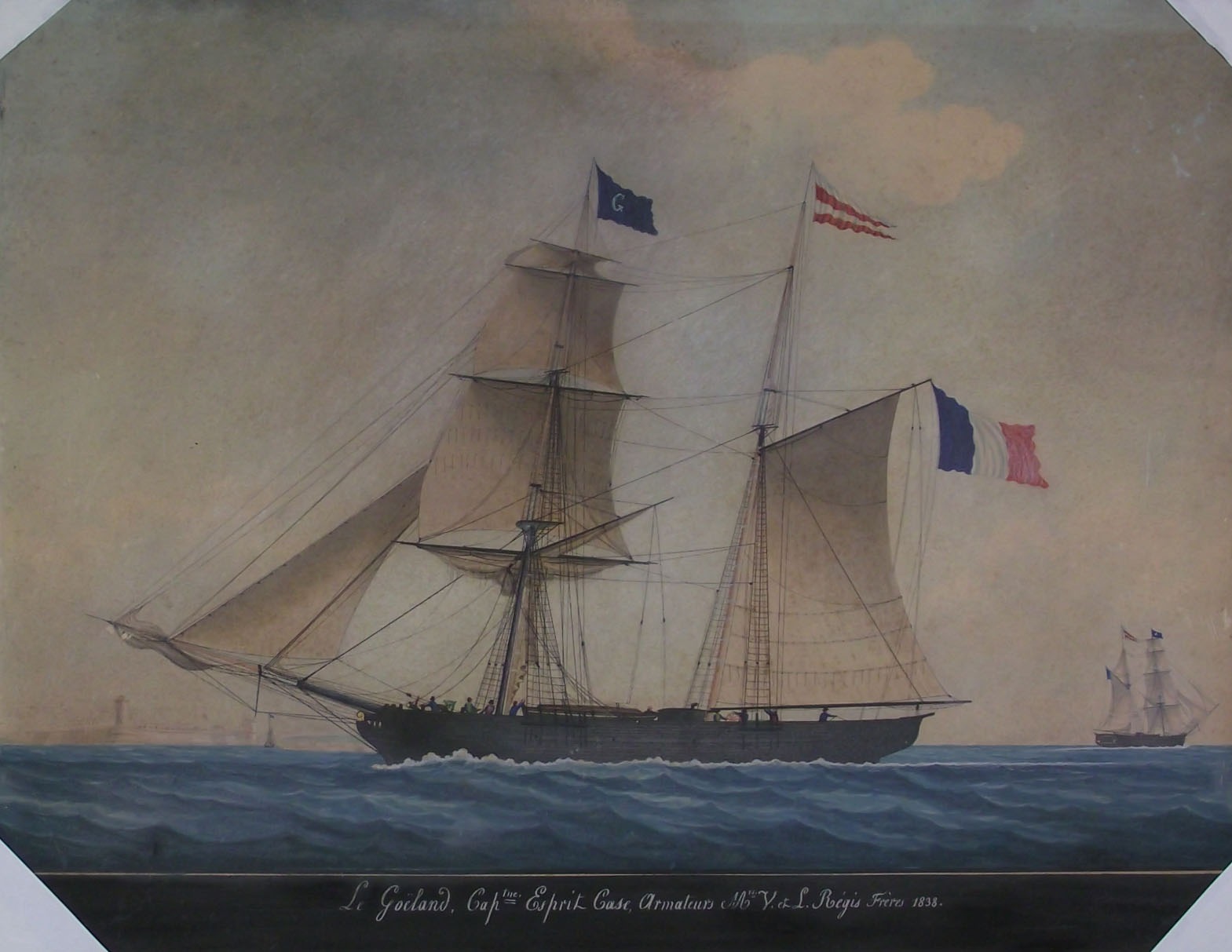
Le Goeland (1838) at the Mariners' Museum

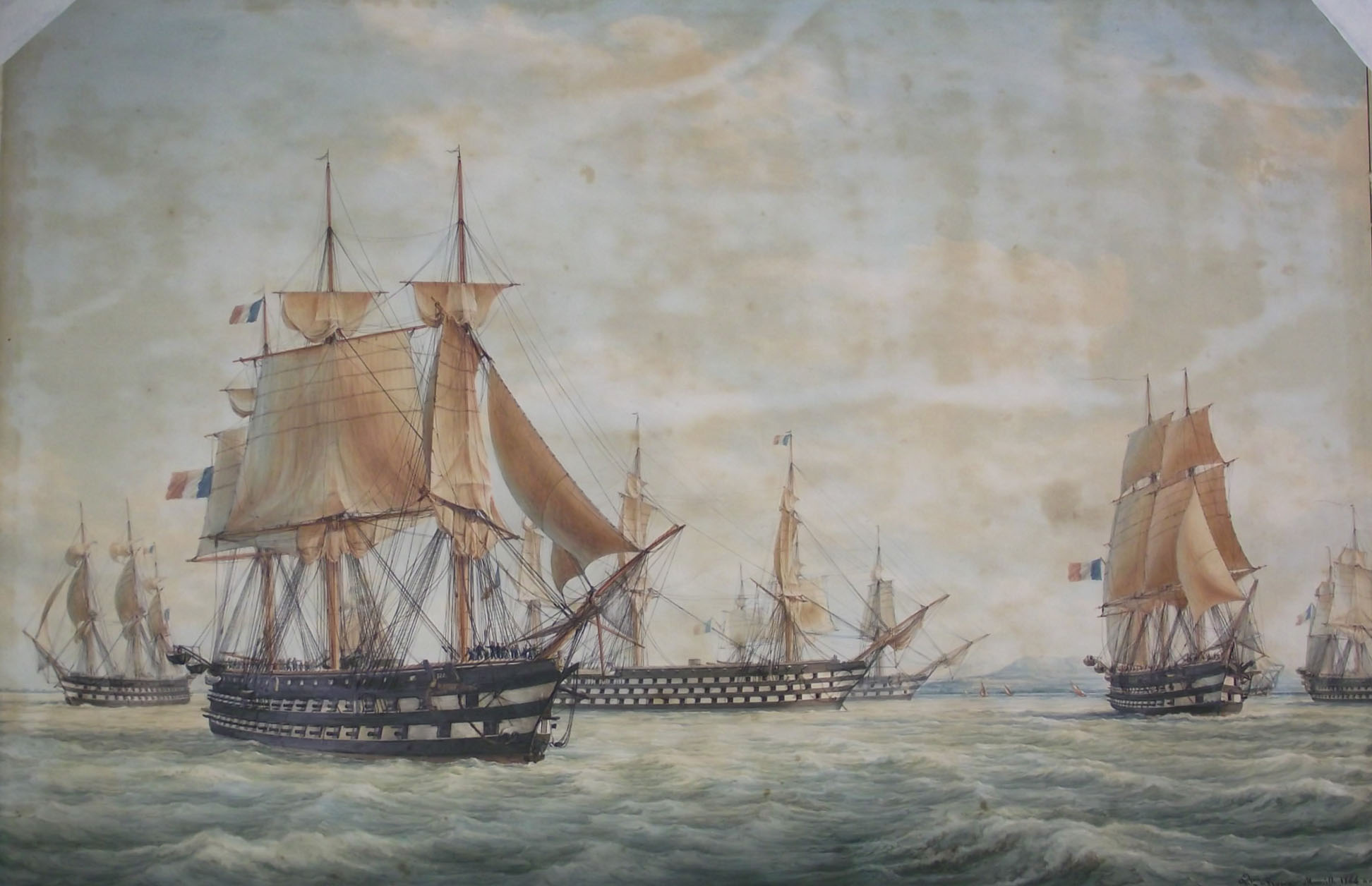
Alignment flotte Francaise Toulon (1864) at the Mariners' Museum

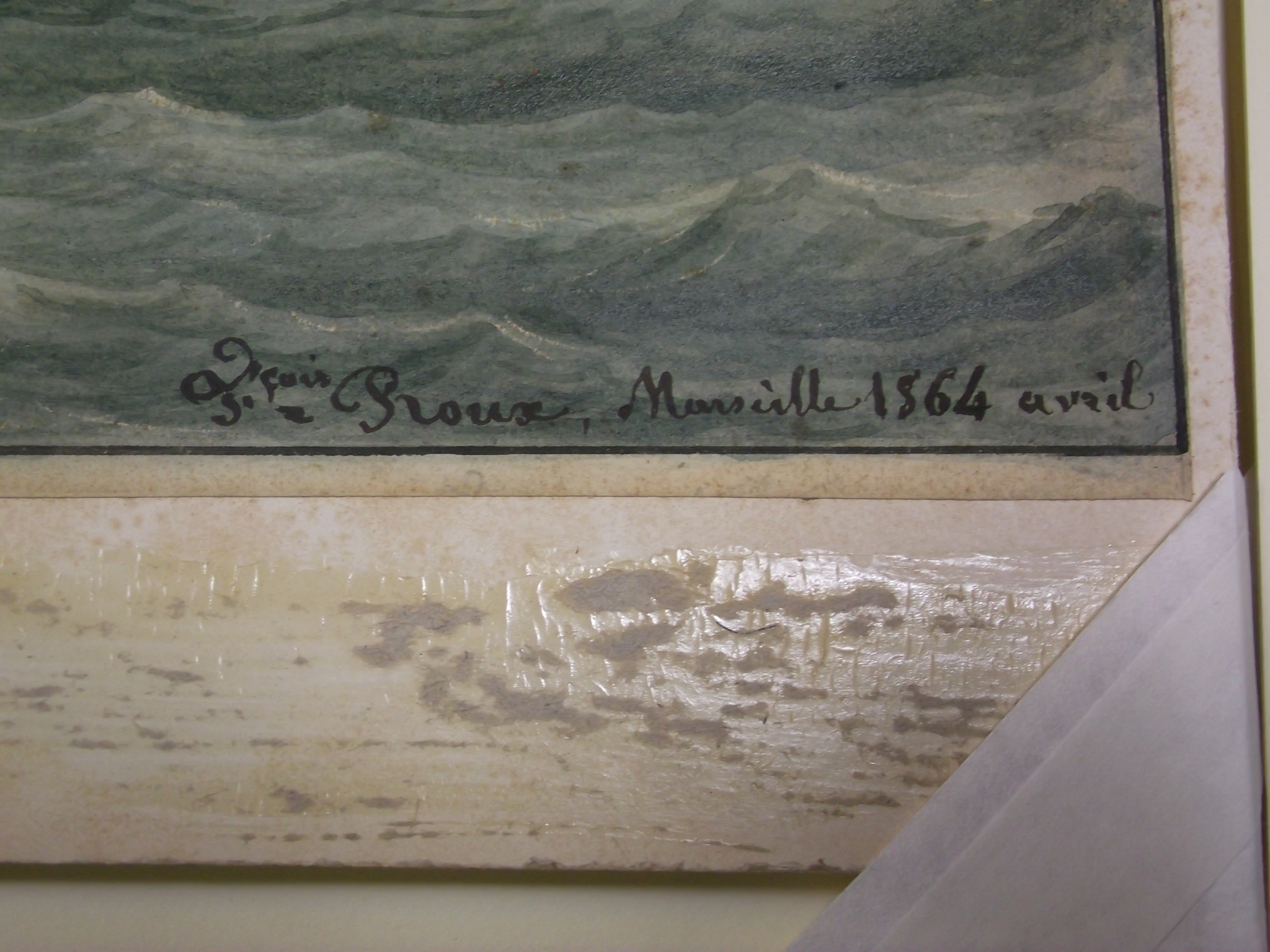
Example of Francois' signature, taken from Alignment Flotte Francaise Toulon (1864)

Annita (1866) at the Mariners' Museum

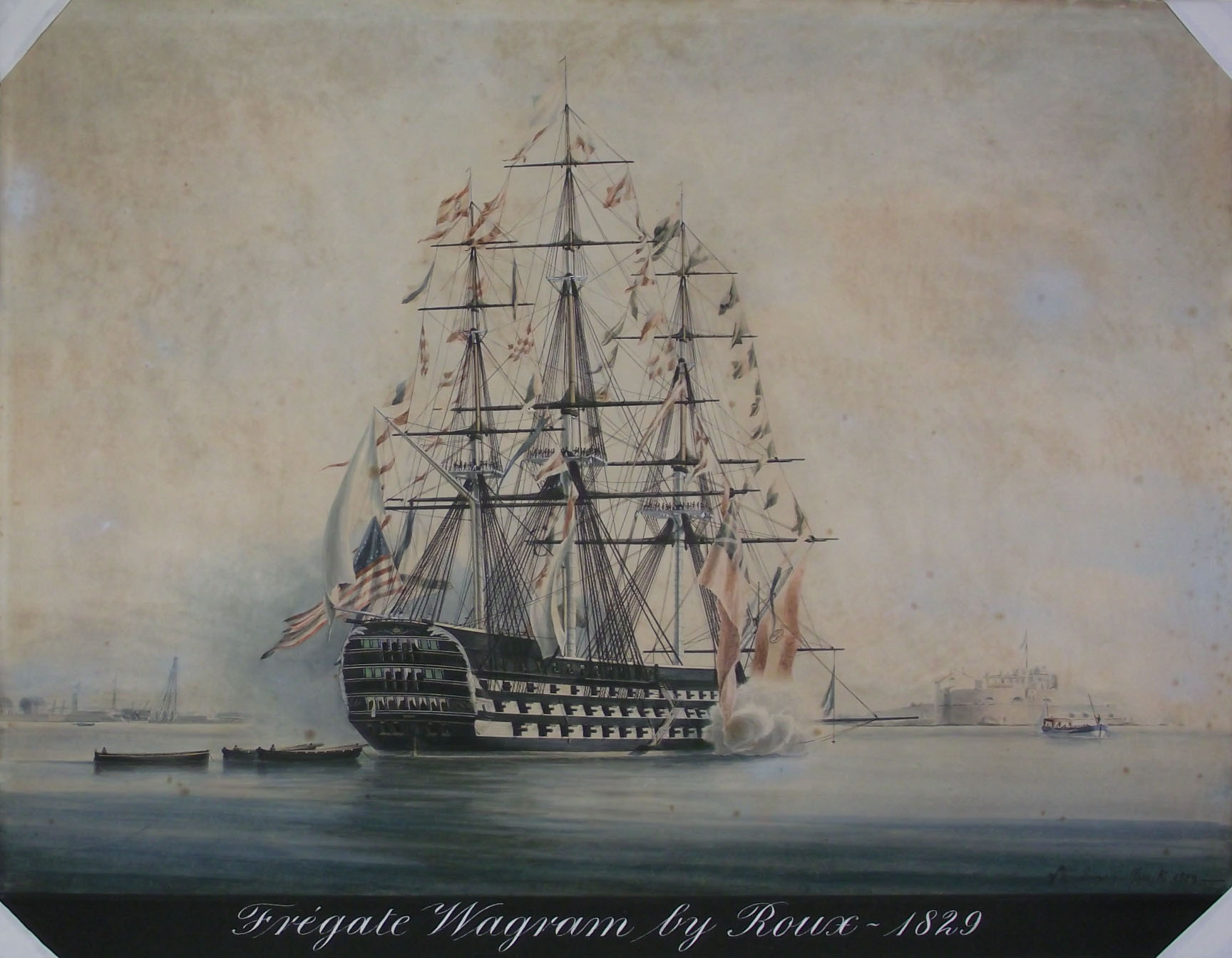
Fregate Wagram (1829) at the Mariners' Museum

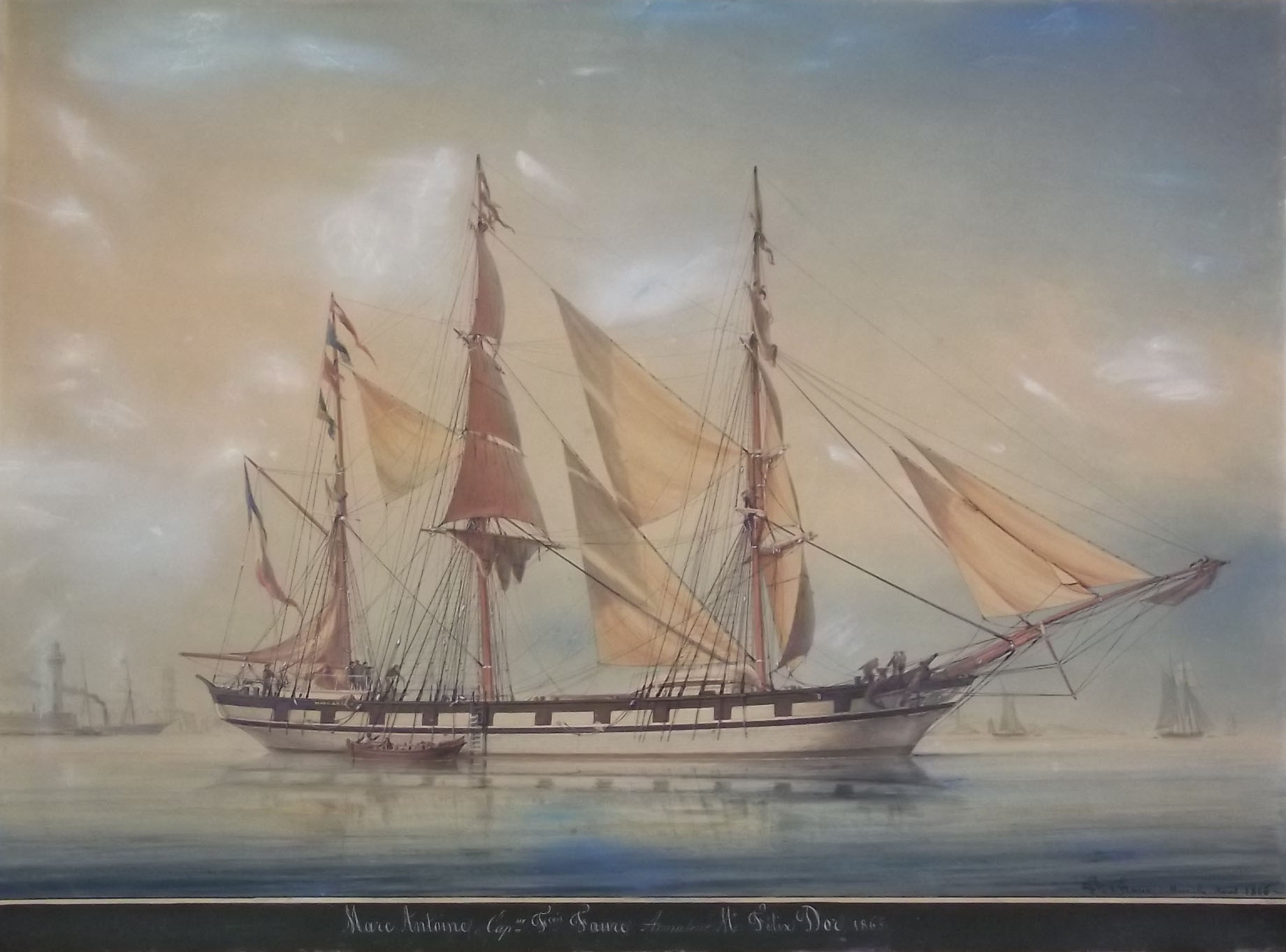
Marc Antoine (1866) at the Mariners' Museum

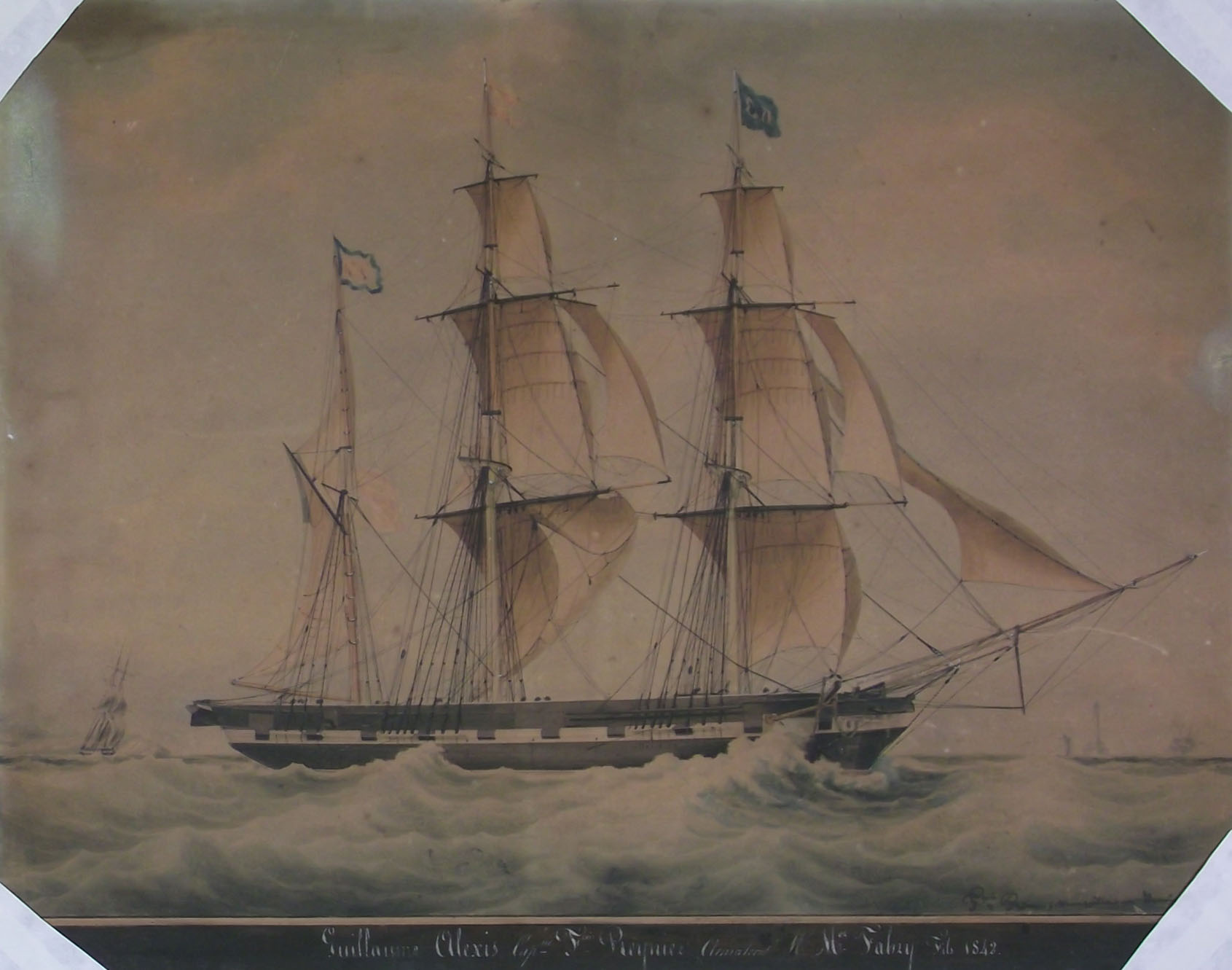
Guillaume Alexis (1843) at the Mariners' Museum

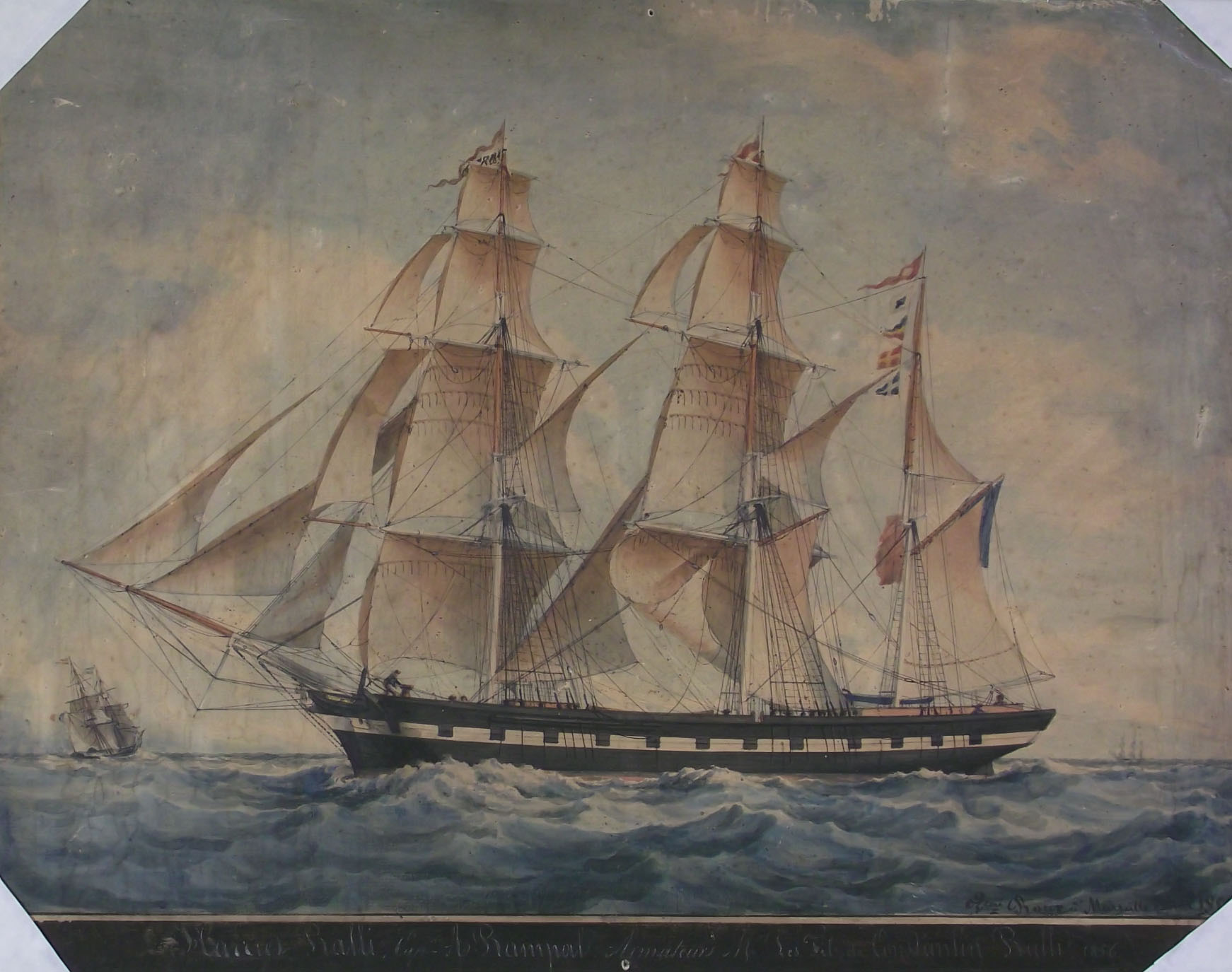
Harriet Ralli (1856) at the Mariners' Museum

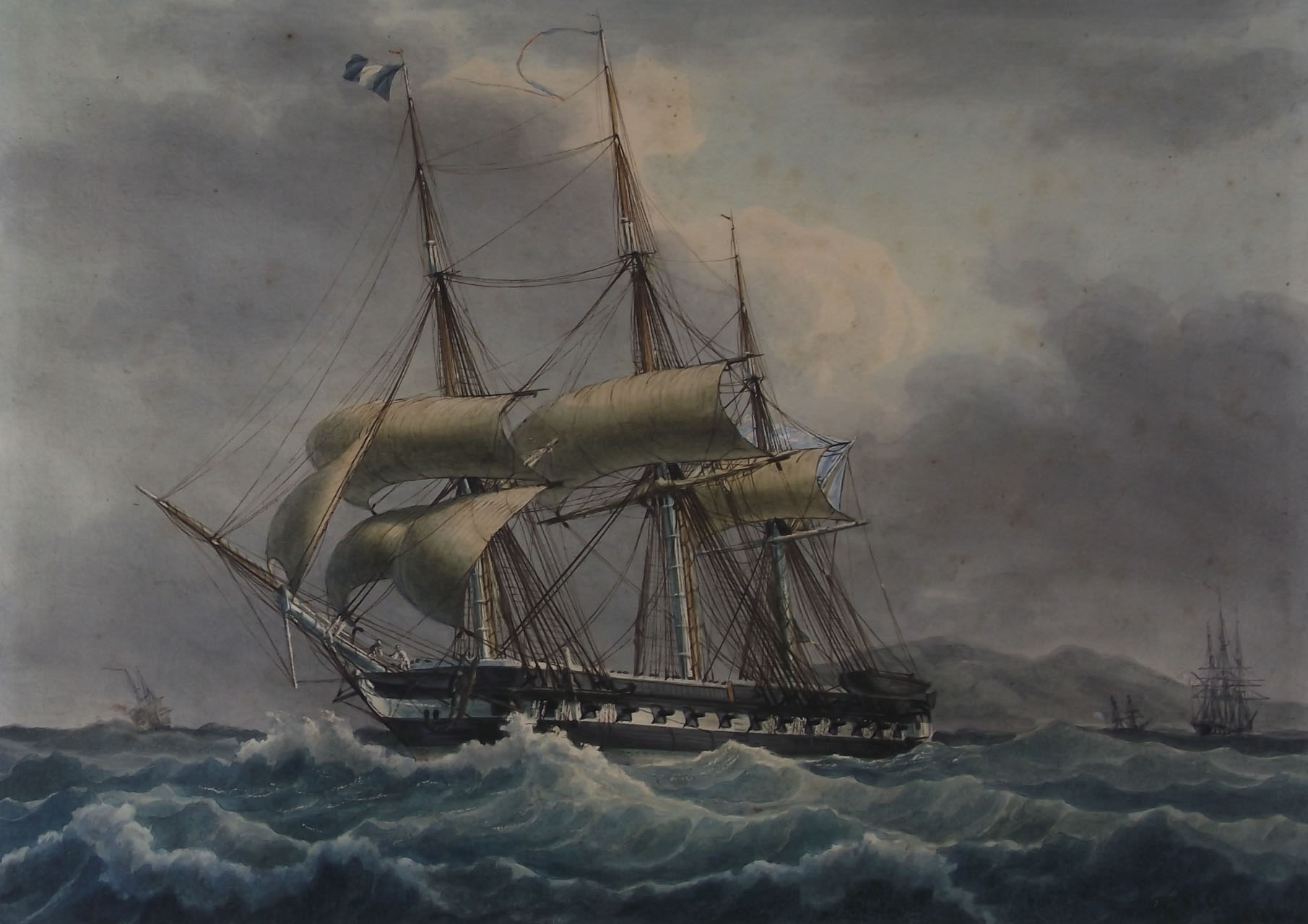
Frigate in a stiff breeze at the Mariners' Museum

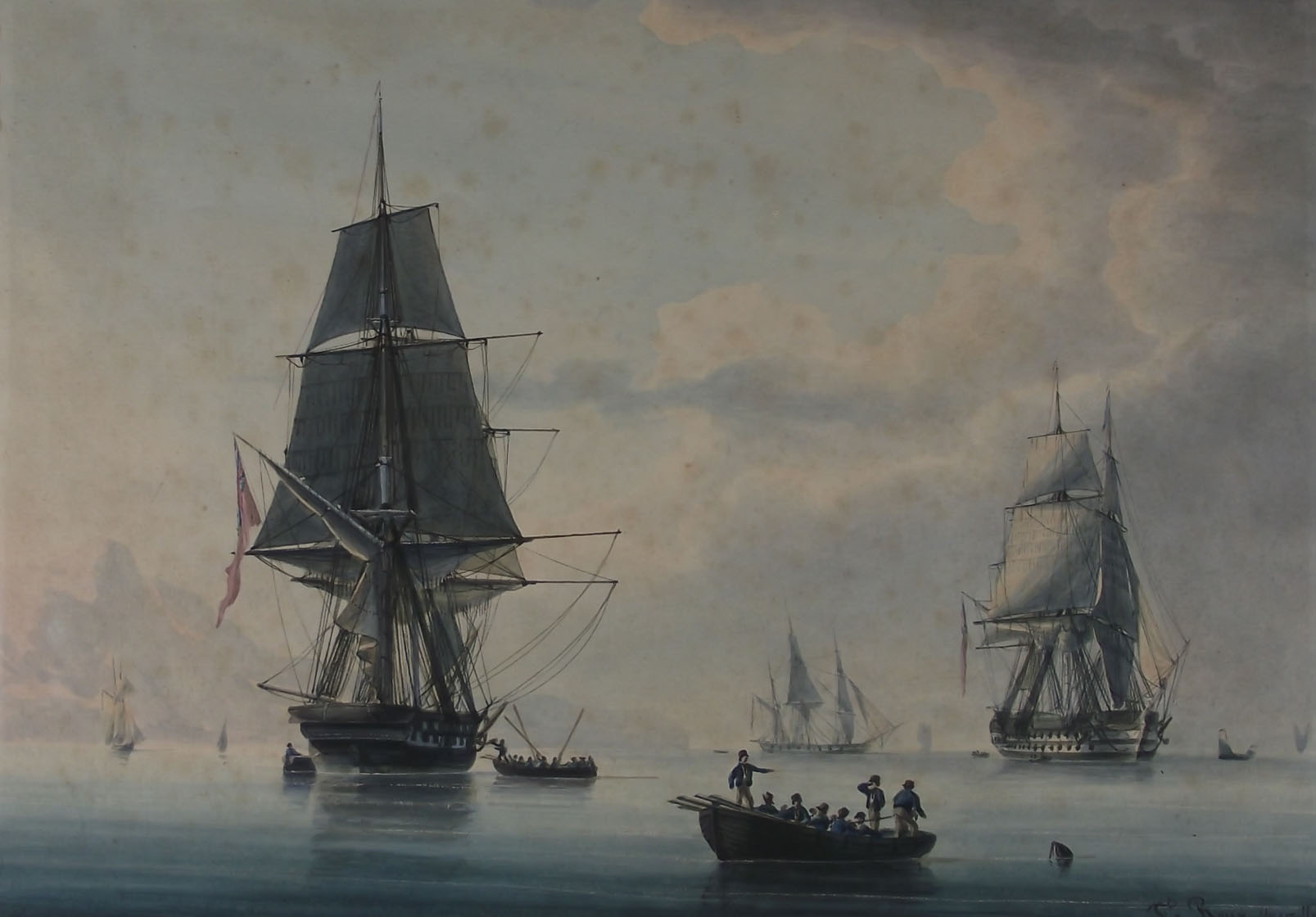
Frigate and small boats in harbor at the Mariners' Museum

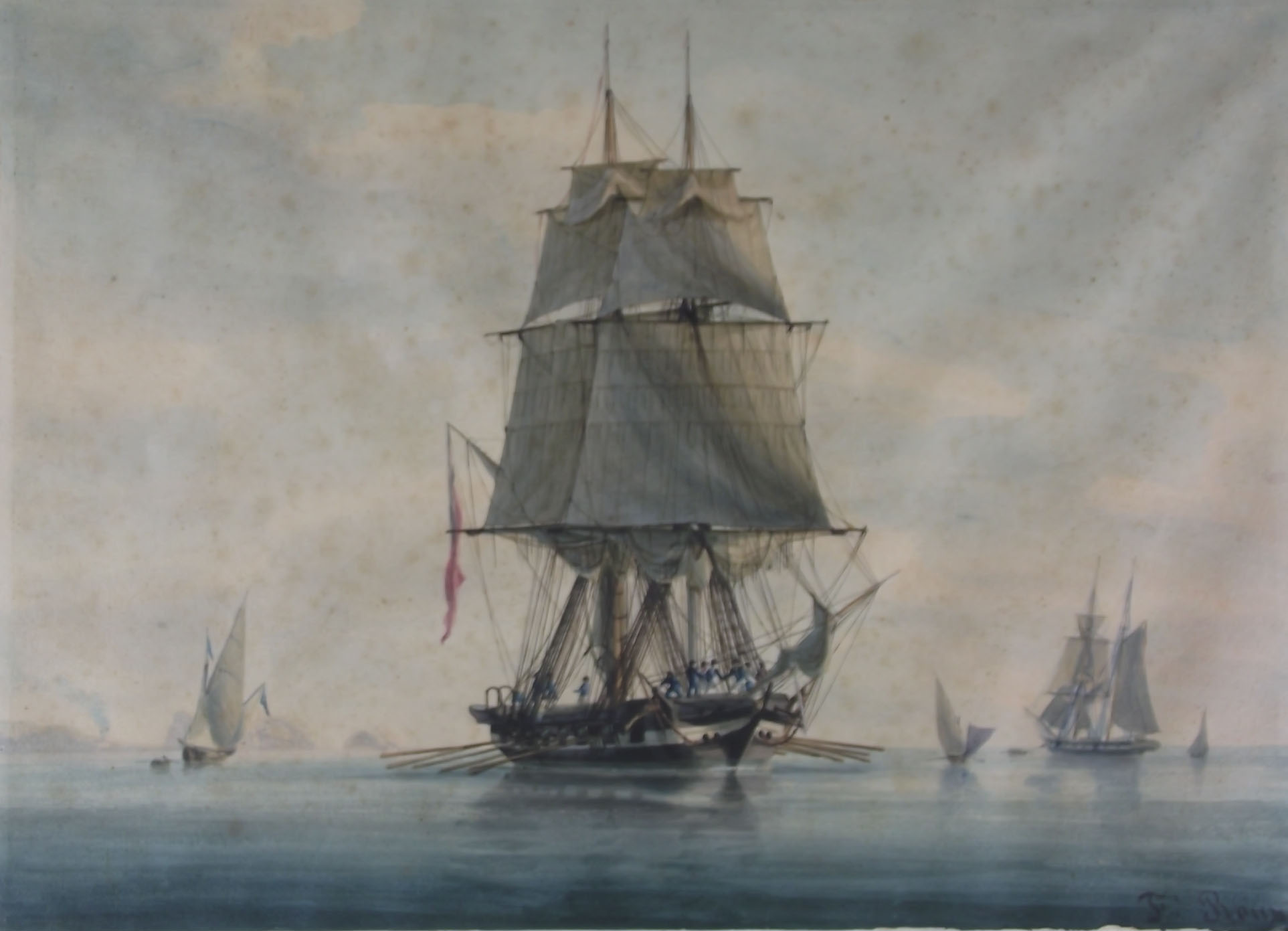
Brig becalmed at the Mariners' Museum

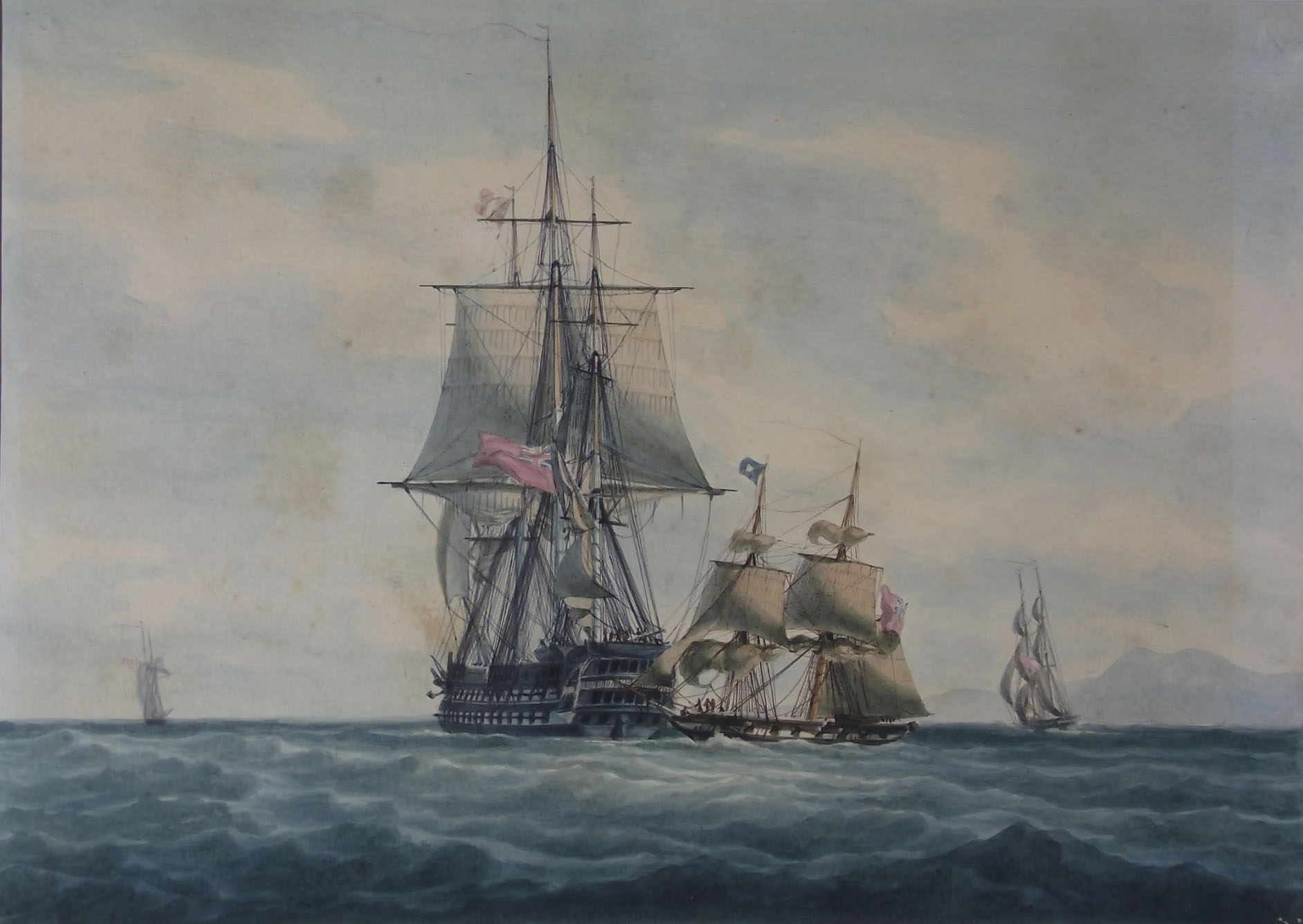
Ship of the line and sailing craft, at the Mariners' Museum

== Exhibitions ==
- July 1 – September 15, 1939 at the Penobscot Marine Museum in Searsport, Maine. 87 watercolors were on display at this exhibition.
- 1955 at the Musée Cantini in Marseille, France where 80 watercolors and some sketchbooks were displayed.
- 1978-1979 at the Peabody Essex Museum in Salem, Massachusetts.

== Family tree ==
The following is the family tree for the Roux family of Marseille.

François Roux
Joseph Roux	Magdeleine Senequier
Joseph Roux	Marie-Ursule Demolin
Ange-Joseph Antoine Roux	Rose Elizabeth Gabrielle Catelin
Mathieu-Antoine Roux	Ursule-Josephine Roux	François Joseph Frederic Roux	François Geoffroi Roux

== Bibliography ==
- Smith, P. C. F. (1978). The Artful Roux: Marine Painters of Marseille. Salem, MA: Peabody Museum of Salem.
- Johnson, A. (Ed.). (1925). Ships and Shipping: A Collection of Pictures Including Many American Vessels Painted by Antoine Roux and his Sons. Salem, MA: Marine Research Society.
- The Penobscot Marine Museum (1939). A Catalogue of a Loan Exhibition of Ship Portraits by the Roux Family of Marseilles. Searsport, ME: The Penobscot Marine Museum.
- Gulliver, L. J. (1930). Ship Portraits by Antoine Roux and Sons. U.S. Naval Institute Proceedings, v. 56 (no.1), pp. 121–122.
