= Antoine Roux =

French painter

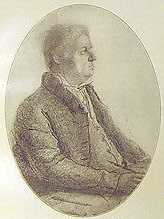
- Born: Ange-Joseph Antoine Roux; 1765; Marseille, France
- Died: 1835 (aged 69–70); Marseille, France
- Known for: Painting, drawing
- Movement: Marine art

Ange-Joseph Antoine Roux (1765–1835) was a French fine art painter who specialised in maritime painting, sometimes referred to as marine art.

== Career ==
Roux came from a family of artists and primarily worked in Marseille. Early in life he was apprenticed to his father, Joseph Roux (1752–93), a hydrographer as well as an artist in his own right, spending his leisure hours painting and drawing. Antoine died of cholera in Marseille in 1835.

All Antoine's four children followed in his artistic footsteps, with his three sons becoming known for their painting as well: Mathieu-Antoine Roux (1799-1872); François Joseph Frédéric Roux (1805–1870), 'Frédéric', was apprenticed to Horace Vernet; and the third, François Geoffroy Roux (1811–1882), 'François', was appointed in 1876 as an official Peintre de la Marine.

== Museum collections ==
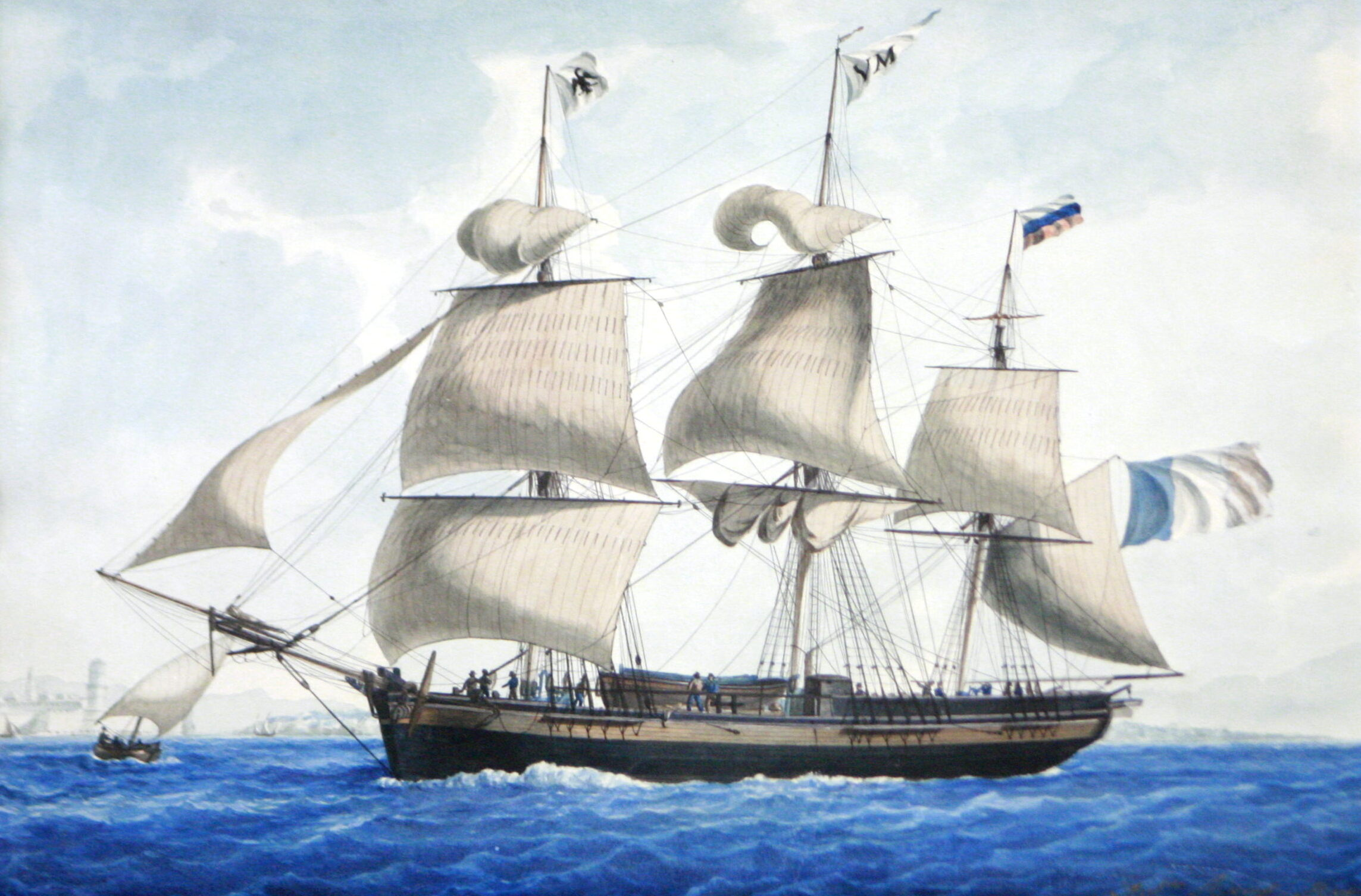
Antoine Roux, Jean-Baptiste du Havre in Marseille harbour, watercolor, Marseille Naval Museum

- The Peabody Essex Museum in Salem, Massachusetts holds a collection of Roux's works.
- The National Maritime Museum, (NMM), London, England.
- New York Public Library, USS President.
- The Mariners' Museum in Newport News, Virginia
- Musée National de la Marine in Paris, France

== Notes and references ==
=== Bibliography ===
- Bres, Louis, A Dynasty of Marine Painters: Antoine Roux and his Sons in Johnson, Alfred, (Transl.), Ships and Shipping: A Collection of Pictures Including Many American Vessels Painted by Antoine Roux and His Sons, Marine Research Society, Pub. Num. 9, Salem MA, 1925.
- Marine Painters of Marseille, Including a Catalogue of the Roux Family Paintings, Peabody Museum, Salem MA, 1978. 73 p., 141 illus., 12 in color.
- Jean Meissonnier, Voiliers de l'Époque romantique, Edita Lausanne, 1991, ISBN 2-88001-273-2
