= 1809 =

1809 in various calendars
- Gregorian calendar: 1809; MDCCCIX
- Ab urbe condita: 2562
- Armenian calendar: 1258; ԹՎ ՌՄԾԸ
- Assyrian calendar: 6559
- Balinese saka calendar: 1730–1731
- Bengali calendar: 1215–1216
- Berber calendar: 2759
- British Regnal year: 49 Geo. 3 – 50 Geo. 3
- Buddhist calendar: 2353
- Burmese calendar: 1171
- Byzantine calendar: 7317–7318
- Chinese calendar: 戊辰年 (Earth Dragon); 4506 or 4299 — to — 己巳年 (Earth Snake); 4507 or 4300
- Coptic calendar: 1525–1526
- Discordian calendar: 2975
- Ethiopian calendar: 1801–1802
- Hebrew calendar: 5569–5570
- Hindu calendars
- Vikram Samvat: 1865–1866
- Shaka Samvat: 1730–1731
- Kali Yuga: 4909–4910
- Holocene calendar: 11809
- Igbo calendar: 809–810
- Iranian calendar: 1187–1188
- Islamic calendar: 1223–1224
- Japanese calendar: Bunka 6 (文化６年)
- Javanese calendar: 1735–1736
- Julian calendar: Gregorian minus 12 days
- Korean calendar: 4142
- Minguo calendar: 103 before ROC 民前103年
- Nanakshahi calendar: 341
- Thai solar calendar: 2351–2352
- Tibetan calendar: ས་ཕོ་འབྲུག་ལོ་ (male Earth-Dragon); 1935 or 1554 or 782 — to — ས་མོ་སྦྲུལ་ལོ་ (female Earth-Snake); 1936 or 1555 or 783

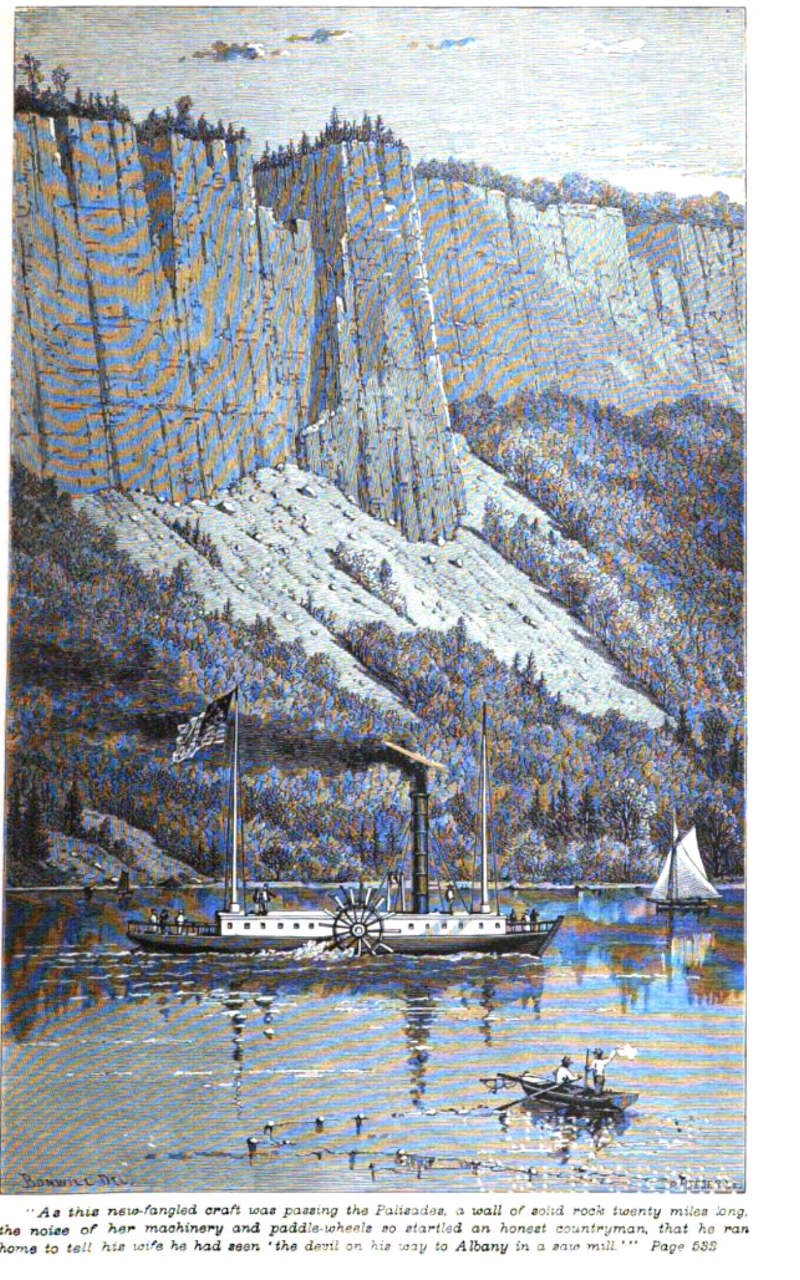
February 11: Robert Fulton receives patent for inventing the steamboat after creating the Clermont.

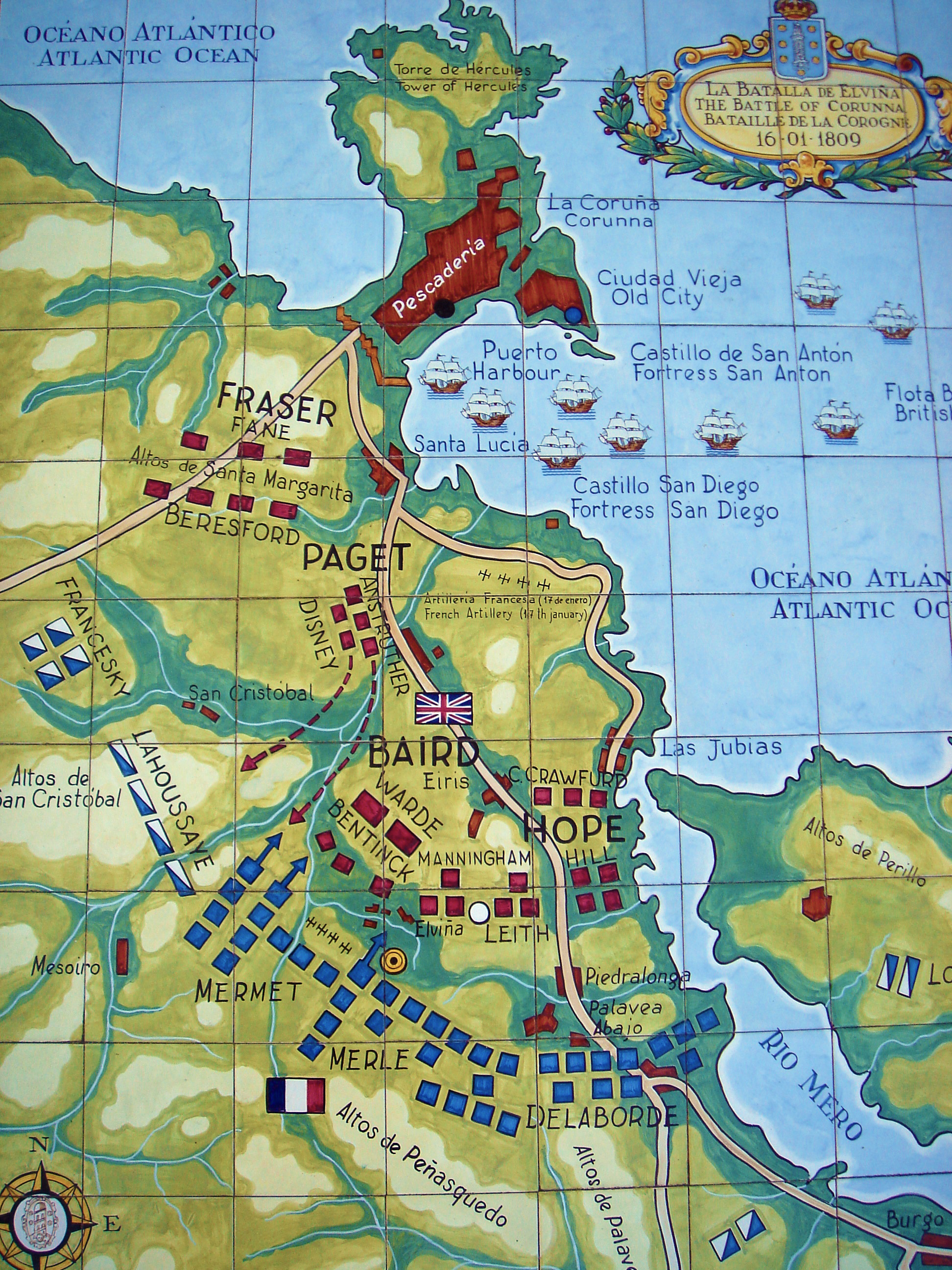
January 16: Battle of Corunna

1809 (MDCCCIX) was a common year starting on Sunday of the Gregorian calendar and a common year starting on Friday of the Julian calendar, the 1809th year of the Common Era (CE) and Anno Domini (AD) designations, the 809th year of the 2nd millennium, the 9th year of the 19th century, and the 10th and last year of the 1800s decade. As of the start of 1809, the Gregorian calendar was 12 days ahead of the Julian calendar, which remained in localized use until 1923.

== Events ==
=== January–March ===
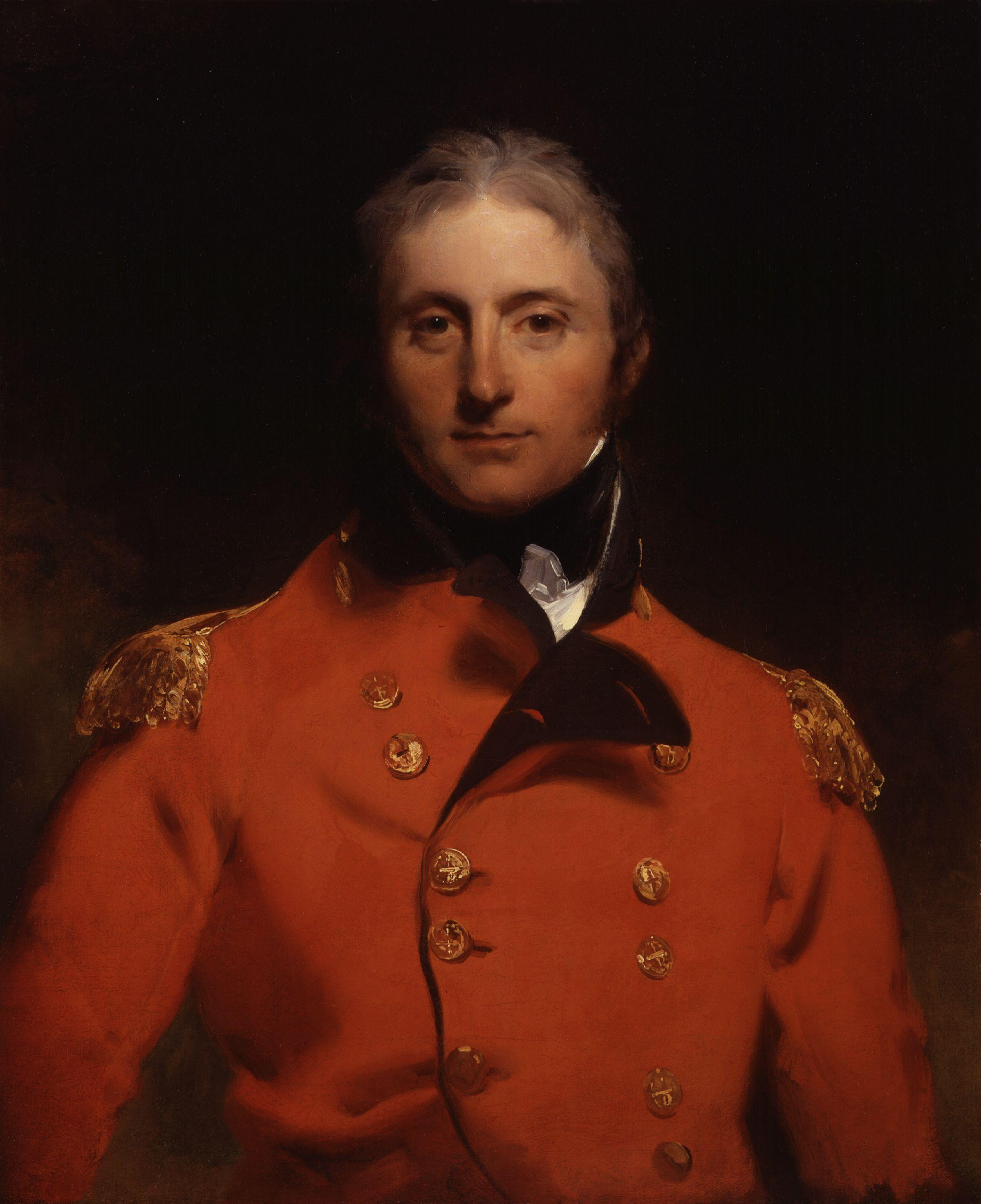
January 16 Sir John Moore is killed at the Battle of Corunna.

- January 5 – The Treaty of the Dardanelles, between the United Kingdom of Great Britain and Ireland and the Ottoman Empire, is concluded.
- January 10 – Peninsular War – French Marshal Jean Lannes begins the Siege of Zaragoza.
- January 14 – The Apodaca–Canning treaty is signed in London between Britain and Spain
- January 16 – Peninsular War – Battle of Corunna in Galicia (Spain): The British (under General Sir John Moore, who is killed) resist an attempt by the French (under Marshal Soult) to prevent them from embarking.
- February 3 – The Illinois Territory is created from the western part of the Indiana Territory.
- February 11 – Robert Fulton patents the steamboat in the United States.
- February 17 – Miami University (Ohio) is established (by Act of February 2) on the township of land required to be set aside for it, under the conditions of the Miami Purchase in 1794.
- February 20
  - United States v. Peters: The Supreme Court of the United States rules that the power of the federal government is greater than any individual state.
  - The Siege of Zaragoza ends as Jose Palafox surrenders. Over 60,000 have been killed, during the 60 day siege.
- February 25 – Battle of Valls: Spanish forces are defeated in Catalonia by Marshal Laurent de Gouvion Saint-Cyr.
- February 27 – Action of 27 February 1809: Captain Bernard Dubourdieu captures HMS Proserpine.
- March 1 – The Embargo Act of 1807 is repealed in the United States; the Non-Intercourse Act replaces it.
- March 13 – A military coup ousts Gustav IV Adolf of Sweden; he is confined in Gripsholm Castle.
- March 28 – Battle of Medellín at Extremadura: Massive casualties are suffered, in a rout by French cavalry, under Marshal Victor.
- March 29
  - At the Diet of Porvoo, Finland's four Estates pledge allegiance to Alexander I of Russia, commencing the secession of the future Grand Duchy of Finland from Sweden. The Emperor, in return, promises to retain and uphold former laws and privileges, as well as the dominant Lutheran religion. His pledge is later interpreted by the Finns as a confirmation of constitutional laws, which had, effectively, established Finland as a separate state in real union with Russia.
  - King Gustav IV Adolf of Sweden abdicates after the Coup of 1809 and is later exiled.
  - Peninsular War – First Battle of Porto: 8,000 Portuguese soldiers are killed in a rout after defeat by the French under Marshal Soult. In the Porto Boat Bridge disaster, 4,000 fleeing civilians drown when a pontoon bridge collapses.

=== April–June ===
- April 9 – Tiroleans rise, under the command of Andreas Hofer, against French and Bavarian occupation.
- April 10 – Napoleonic Wars – The War of the Fifth Coalition begins when forces of the Austrian Empire invade Bavaria.
- April 11–15 – Napoleonic Wars – Battle of the Basque Roads: The British Royal Navy defeats the French fleet in the mouth of the Charente, although officers on both sides face subsequent courts-martial.
- April 18 – The 2,000 Guineas Stakes horse race is first run in England.
- April 19 – War of the Fifth Coalition:
  - Battle of Raszyn: The armies of the Austrian Empire are defeated by the Duchy of Warsaw.
  - Battle of Teugen-Hausen: The armies of the Austrian Empire are defeated by the French and their Bavarian allies.
- April 20 – Battle of Abensberg, Bavaria: Napoleon defeats Austria.
- April 21 – Battle of Landshut: Napoleon defeats Austria, in yet another battle.
- April 22 – Battle of Eckmühl: French troops under Napoleon I and Marshal Davout defeat the Austrians, under Archduke Charles.
- April 23 – Battle of Ratisbon: Napoleon I fights his last battle during the Bavarian phase of the War of the Fifth Coalition
- May 3
  - The Battle of Nimla which allows Mahmud Shah Durrani to seize the Durrani throne from his brother, Shah Shuja Durrani.
  - Battle of Ebelsberg: André Masséna defeats Austrian General Johann von Hiller, forcing him to retreat.
- May 5
  - Mary Kies is the first American woman to be awarded a patent (for a technique of weaving straw hats with silk and thread).
  - The Swiss canton of Aargau declares Jews citizens.
- May 10 – Gustav IV Adolf is officially deposed from the Swedish throne, by the Riksdag of the Estates.
- May 10–11 – Peninsular War – Battle of Grijó: the Anglo-Portuguese Army, commanded by Sir Arthur Wellesley, defeats the French army, commanded by Marshal Soult, in Portugal.
- May 12 – Peninsular War – Second Battle of Porto: The Anglo-Portuguese Army, commanded by Wellesley, drives the French army, commanded by Marshal Soult, out of Porto, and forces them to retreat from the country.
- May 17 – Napoleon I of France orders the annexation of the Papal States to the French Empire. When he announces that the Pope's secular power has ended, the Pope excommunicates him.
- May 21 – Battle of Aspern-Essling begins.
- May 22 – Battle of Aspern-Essling: Austrian troops under Archduke Karl beat the French under Napoleon, in a hard-fought battle.
- May 24 – Dartmoor Prison opens in England, to house French prisoners of war.
- May 31
  - Mauritius campaign of 1809–11 – Action of 31 May 1809 in the Bay of Bengal: The French frigate Caroline, operating from Isle de France (Mauritius), captures most of a British East India Company fleet
  - The famous composer Joseph Haydn dies in Vienna at age 77 following Napoleon's second siege of Vienna
- June 6 – Sweden promulgates a new Instrument of Government, which restores political power to the Riksdag of the Estates, after authoritarian rule since 1772. On the same day, Duke Charles (uncle of the deposed king Gustav IV Adolf) is elected King, under the name Charles XIII. In November he is affected by a heart attack and will be largely incapacitated for the remainder of his reign (until 1818).
- June 7 – Shoja Shah of the Durrani Empire signs a treaty with the British; only weeks later, he is succeeded by Mahmud Shah.
- June 14 – A French victory, in the battle of Raab, prevents archduke John of Austria from bringing any significant force to the Battle of Wagram.
- June 26 – Danish adventurer Jørgen Jørgensen deposes Count Frederich Trampe as governor of Iceland in the Revolution of 1809 and declares himself "Protector of Iceland".

=== July–September ===
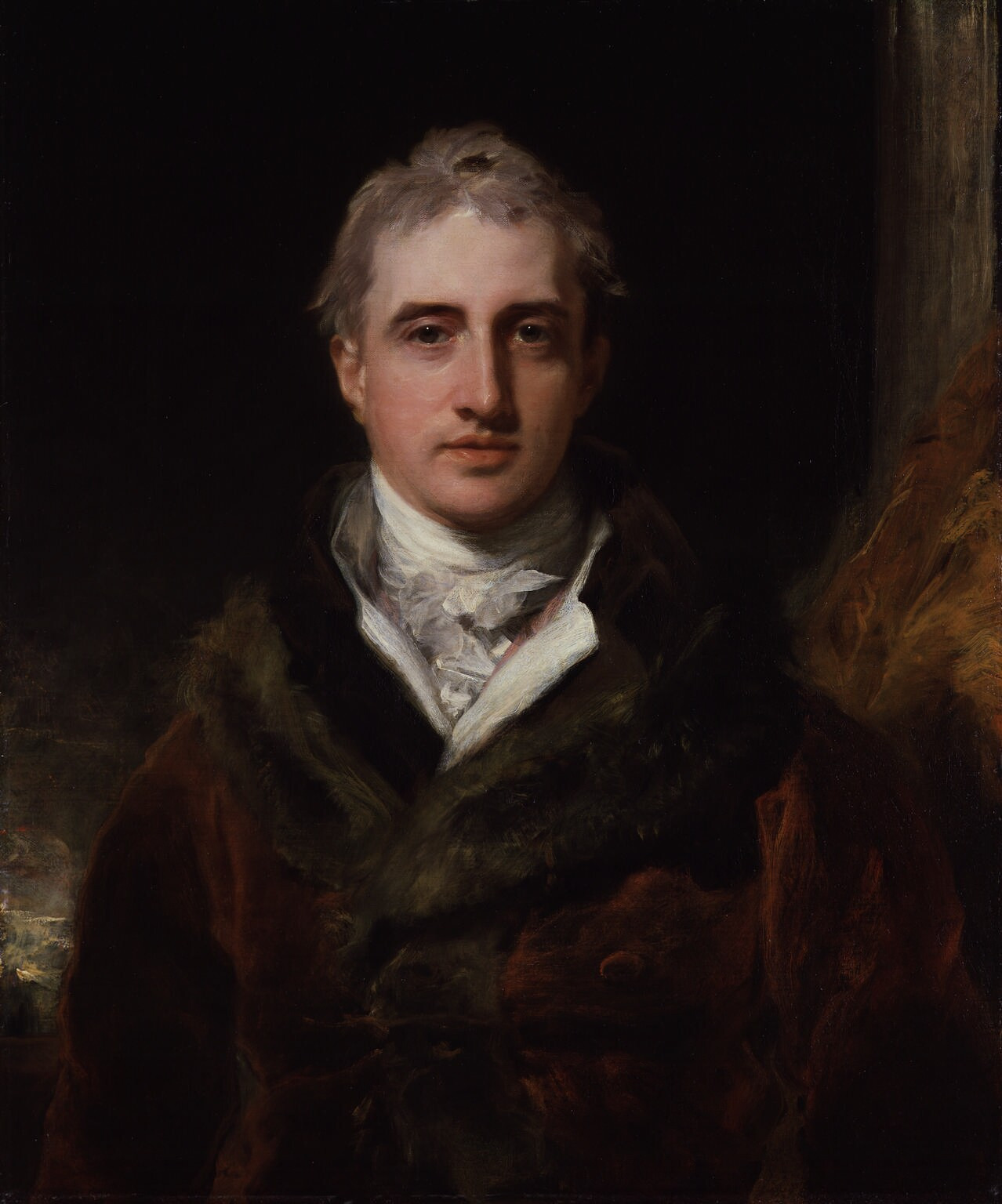
Lord Castlereagh by Thomas Lawrence. The Irish politician fought a duel with his colleague George Canning on Putney Heath.

- July 5 – Battle of Wagram begins.
- July 6
  - French troops arrest Pope Pius VII, and take him to Liguria.
  - Napoleon defeats the Austrians at the Battle of Wagram.
- July 8–9 – Finnish War – Naval Battle of Porkala: The Swedish archipelago fleet defeats the Russians.
- July 10 – Battle of Znaim begins.
- July 11 French Marshal, Auguste de Marmont, and André Masséna fights inconclusively against the Austrians, in The Battle of Znaim
- July 16 – The city of La Paz (in modern-day Bolivia) declares its independence from the Spanish Crown and forms the Junta Tuitiva, the first independent government in Spanish America, led by Pedro Domingo Murillo.
- July 28 – Peninsula War – Battle of Talavera: Sir Arthur Wellesley's British, Portuguese and Spanish army defeats a French force.
- July 30 – Walcheren Campaign: A British invasion army lands on Walcheren.
- August – The USS Constitution ("Old Ironsides") is recommissioned as the flagship of the North Atlantic Squadron.
- August 8 – Seventy disciples of Vilna Gaon arrive in Palestine.
- August 10 – Ecuador declares independence from Spain.
- August 11 – Battle of Almonacid de Toledo: A poorly led Spanish army is defeated by King Joseph Bonaparte's French army.
- September 17 – Finnish War: The Peace of Hamina is signed between Russia and Sweden. The future Grand Duchy of Finland is ceded to Russia by the Treaty of Fredrikshamn.
- September 18 – A new theatre for the Royal Opera House opens in London to replace the first, burnt down in a fire in 1808. The price increases lead to the Old Price Riots, which last for 64 days.
- September 21 – British Secretary of War Lord Castlereagh and Foreign Secretary George Canning meet in a duel on Putney Heath, with Castlereagh wounding Canning in the thigh.

=== October–December ===
- October 8 – Prince Klemens von Metternich becomes foreign minister of the Austrian Empire.
- October 11 – Along the Natchez Trace in Tennessee, explorer Meriwether Lewis dies under mysterious circumstances at an inn called Grinder's Stand.
- October 14 – The Treaty of Schönbrunn cedes the Illyrian Provinces to France, and ensures peace between The First French Empire, and The Austrian Empire.
- October 25 – The Golden Jubilee of George III is celebrated in commemoration of the forty-ninth anniversary of the accession of King George III and his entrance into the 50th year of his reign.
- November 18 – Napoleonic Wars: Action of 18 November 1809 – In the Bay of Bengal, a French frigate squadron captures three British East Indiamen mainly carrying recruits for the presidency armies in India.
- November 19 – Battle of Ocaña: A Spanish army is ridden down, and 4,000 are killed and wounded by French forces.
- November 21 – First stone laid of first 'guided bus' passenger wagonway Gloucester and Cheltenham Tramroad.
- November 25 – Benjamin Bathurst, a British diplomat, mysteriously disappears (possibly murdered) in Perleberg, west of Berlin.
- December – Boyd massacre: Whangaroa Māori people kill and eat 66 crew and passengers of the brigantine Boyd in New Zealand.
- December 25 – American physician Ephraim McDowell performs the first ovariotomy, removing a 22-pound tumor.
- December 26 – A British invasion force leaves Vlissingen.
- December 30 – Wearing masks at balls is forbidden in Boston, Massachusetts.

=== Date unknown ===
- William Combe begins publication of the verse Tour of Dr. Syntax in search of the Picturesque in Ackermann's Political Magazine (London), illustrated with cartoons by Thomas Rowlandson, depicting comic and ridiculous scenes involving a hapless country physician, and coming to represent British Regency humour.
- Louis Poinsot describes the two remaining Kepler–Poinsot polyhedra.
- Jean-Baptiste Lamarck publishes Philosophie Zoologique, outlining a (wrong) concept of evolution, by acquisition or loss of inherited characteristics through use or disuse.
- British recruits to the British East India Company (and subsequently to the Indian Civil Service) are required to learn at least one Indian language fluently.
- Arorae, an atoll of the Gilbert Islands, is sighted by Captain John Patterson on British brig Elizabeth and first named Hope Island.

== Births ==
=== January–June ===
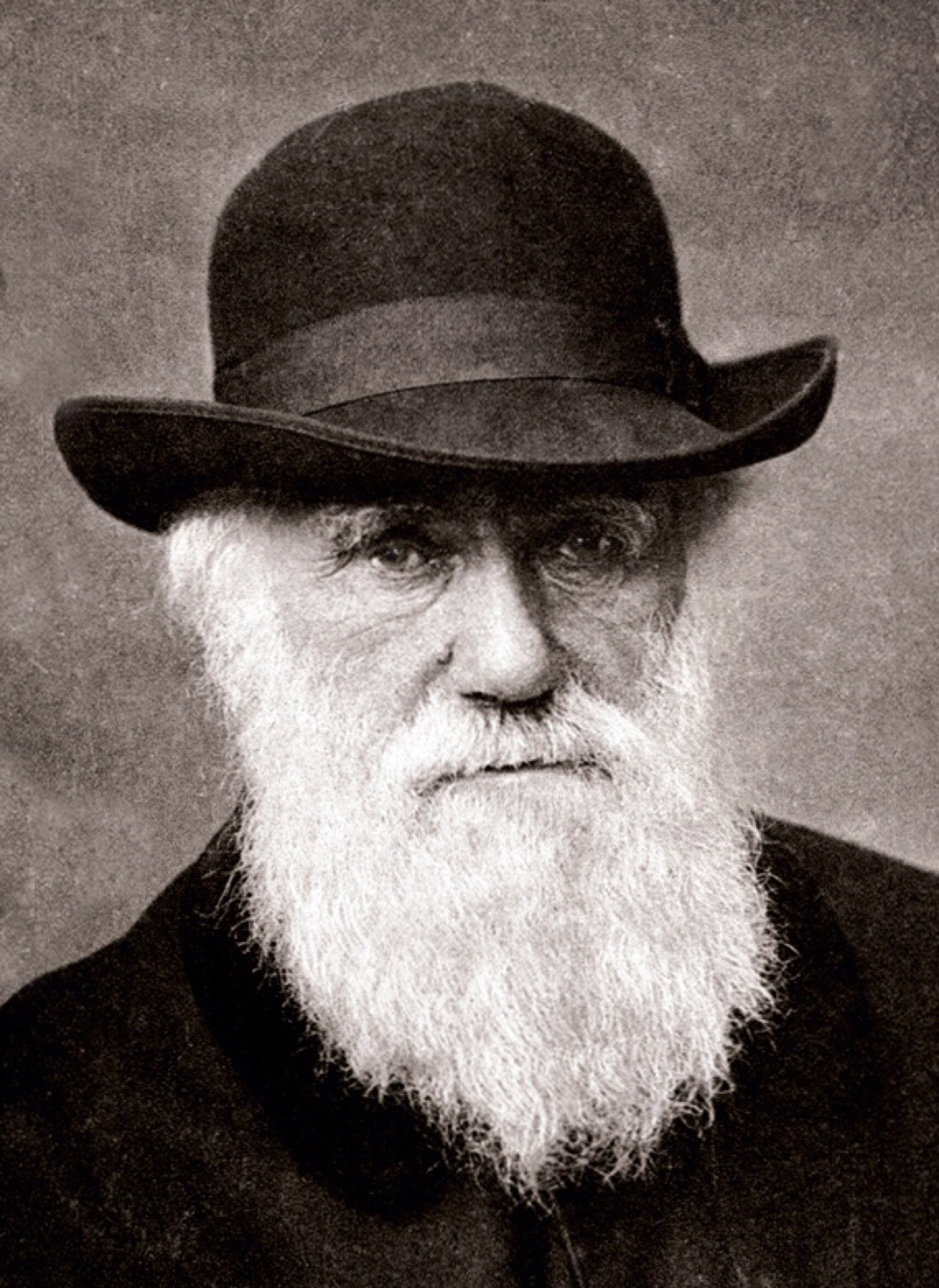
Abraham Lincoln and Charles Darwin, b. February 12, 1809

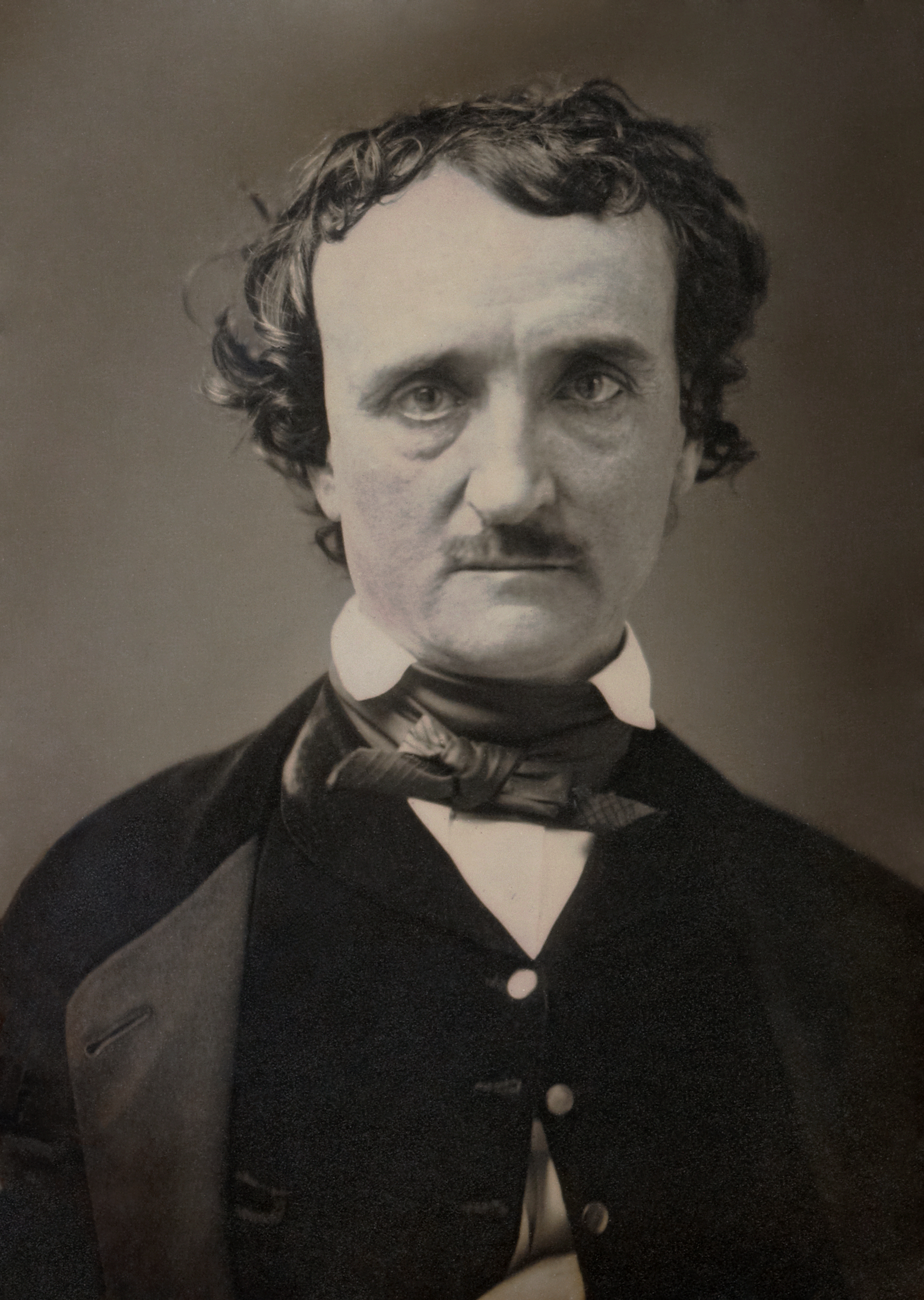
Edgar Allan Poe

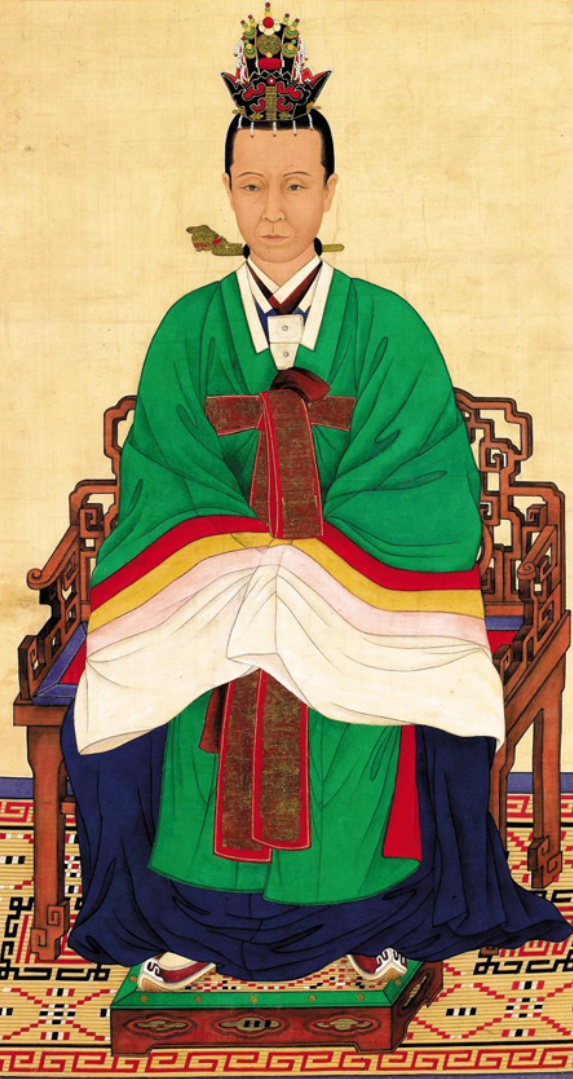
Queen Sinjeong

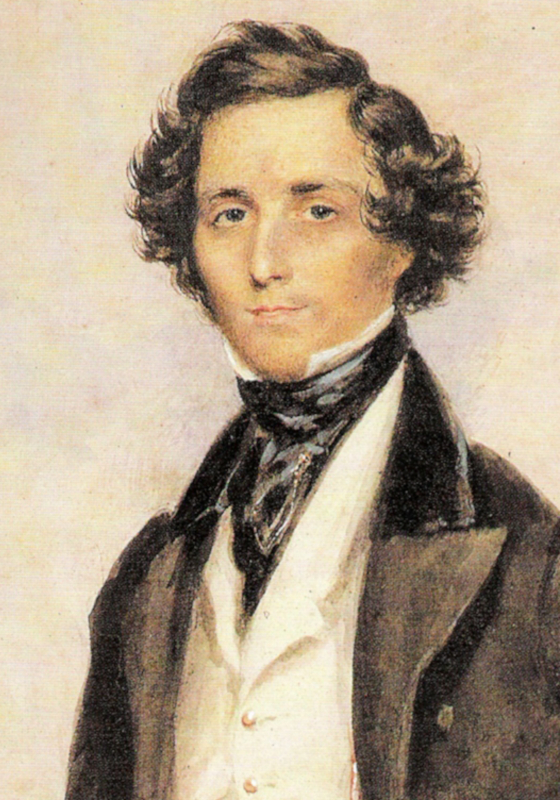
Felix Mendelssohn

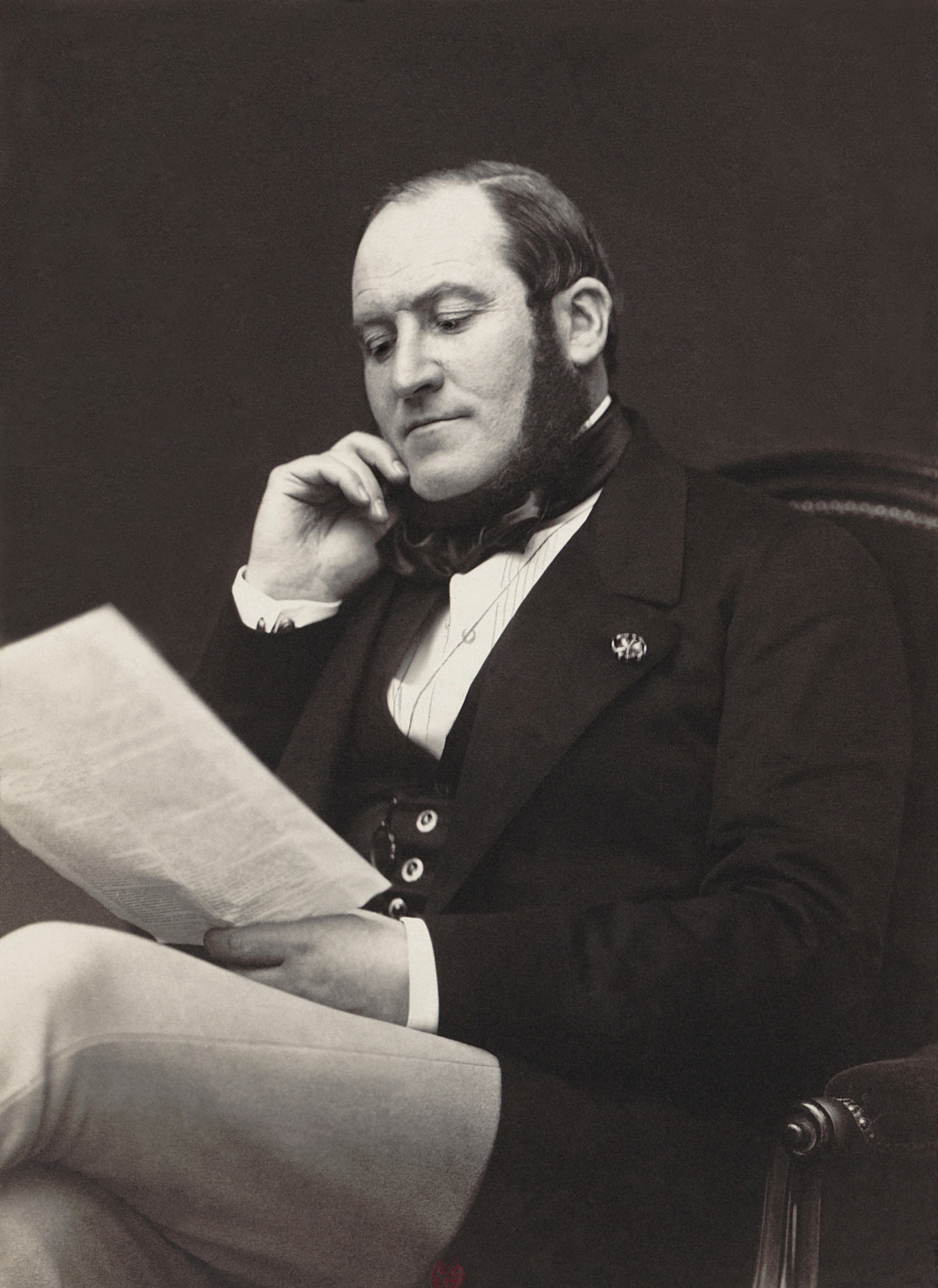
Georges-Eugène Haussmann

- January 1 – Cao Bá Quát, Vietnamese poet (d. 1855)
- January 4 – Louis Braille, French teacher, inventor of braille (d. 1852)
- January 6 – Marie Durocher, Brazilian obstetrician, physician (d. 1893)
- January 15
  - Cornelia Connelly, American founder of the Society of the Holy Child Jesus (d. 1879)
  - Pierre-Joseph Proudhon, French anarchist (d. 1864)
- January 19 – Edgar Allan Poe, American writer, poet (d. 1849)
- January 21 – Queen Sinjeong, Korean regent (d. 1890)
- February 1 – Sophia Crichton-Stuart, Marchioness of Bute, Scottish philanthropist (d. 1859)
- February 3 – Felix Mendelssohn, German composer (d. 1847)
- February 12
  - Charles Darwin, British naturalist (d. 1882)
  - Abraham Lincoln, 16th President of the United States (d. 1865)
- February 15 – Cyrus McCormick, American inventor (d. 1884)
- February 20 – Albertus Jacobus Duymaer van Twist, Governor-General of the Dutch East Indies (d. 1887)
- February 23 – William Sprague, American minister and politician from Michigan (d. 1868)
- February 24 – Edwin Freiherr von Manteuffel, Prussian field marshal (d. 1885)
- March 1 – Robert Cornelius, American pioneer of photography (d 1893)
- March 2 – Abel Douay, French general (d. 1870)
- March 15 – Joseph Jenkins Roberts, 2-time President of Liberia (d. 1876)
- March 23 – Charlotte von Hagn, German actress (d. 1891)
- March 24 – Joseph Liouville, French mathematician (d. 1882)
- March 27 – Georges-Eugène Haussmann, French civic planner (d. 1891)
- March 29 – Bettino Ricasoli, Italian statesman (d. 1880)
- April 1 – Nikolai Gogol, Russian writer (d. 1852)
- April 15 – Hermann Grassmann, Prussian mathematician (d. 1877)
- April 20 – James David Forbes, Scottish physicist, geologist, inventor (d. 1868)
- May 22 – Constantin A. Kretzulescu, 7th Prime Minister of Romania (d. 1884)
- May 23 – Hugo von Kirchbach, Prussian general (d. 1887)
- June 4
  - Columbus Delano, American statesman (d. 1896)
  - John Henry Pratt, English clergyman and mathematician (d. 1871)
- June 8 – Richard Wigginton Thompson, American politician (d. 1900)
- June 11 – Juan Antonio Pezet, Peruvian general and politician, President of Peru (d. 1879)
- June 18 – Stephen Greenleaf Bulfinch, American minister, hymn writer (d 1870)
- June 20 – Isaak August Dorner, German theologian (d. 1884)
- June 21 – Wilhelm Wolff, German political activist (d. 1864)
- June 27 – François Certain de Canrobert, French general, Marshal of France (d. 1895)

=== July–December ===
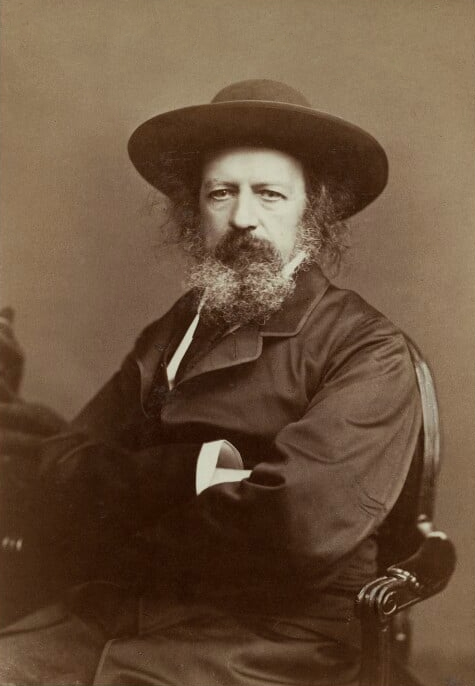
Alfred, Lord Tennyson

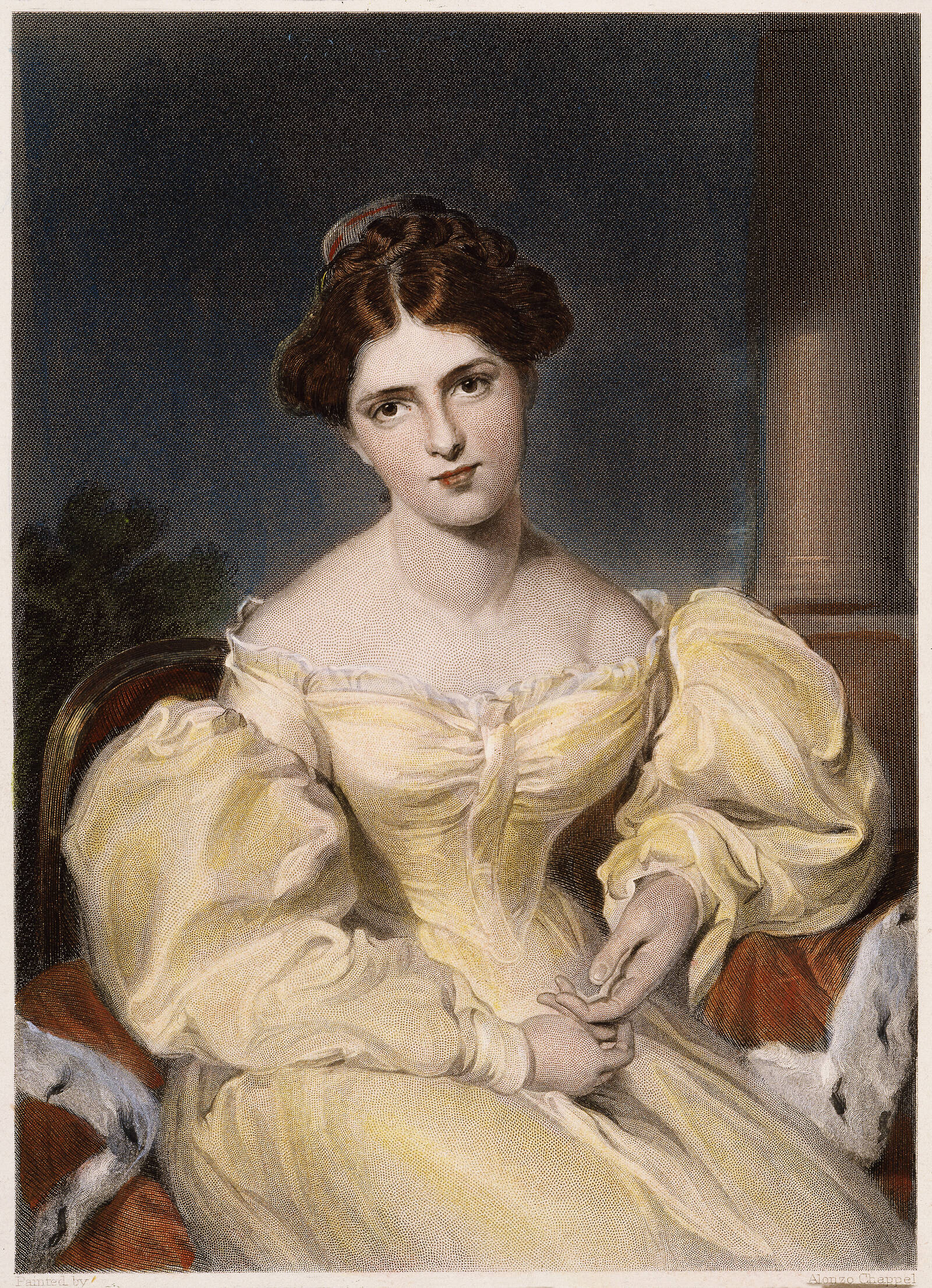
Fanny Kemble

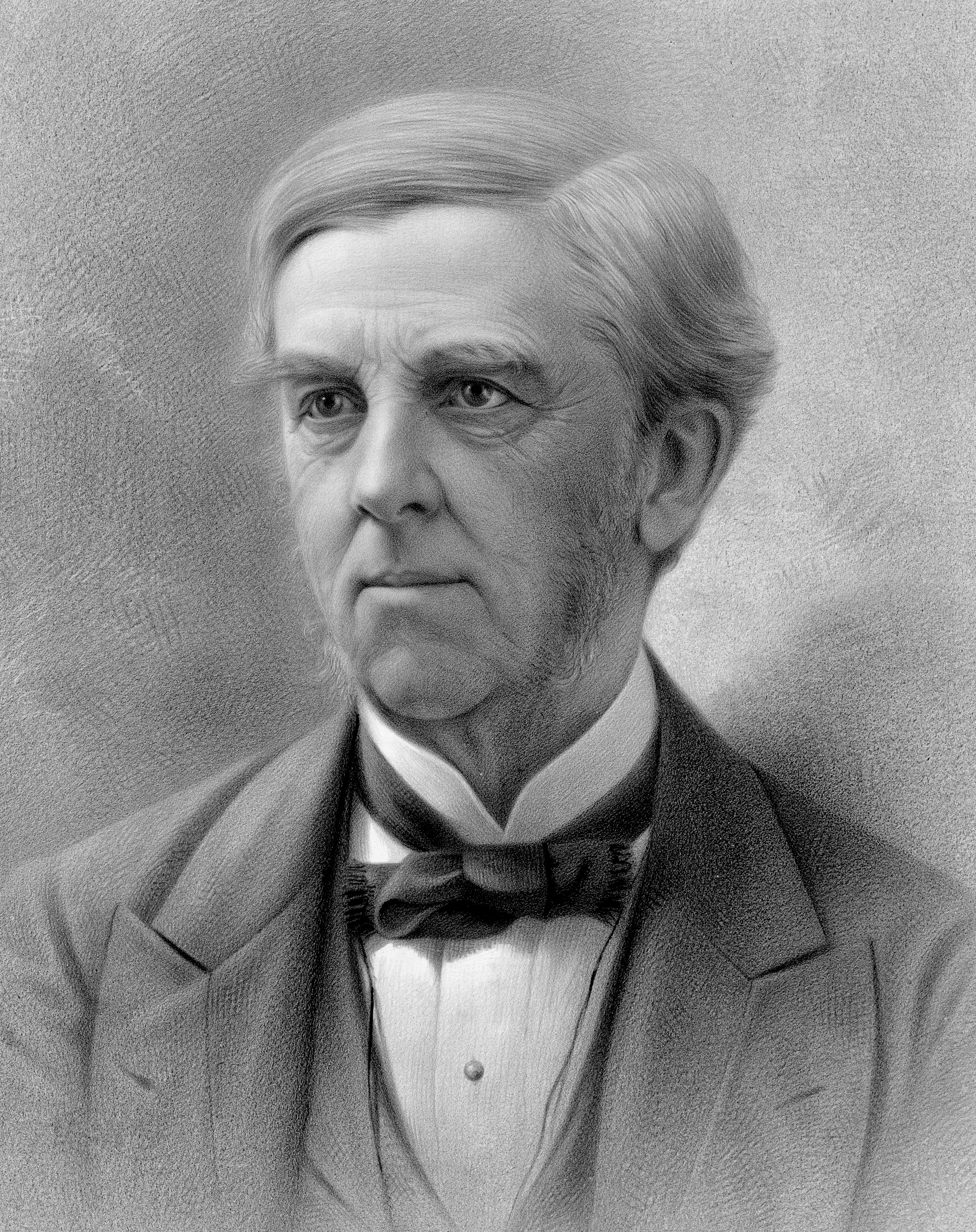
Oliver Wendell Holmes Sr.

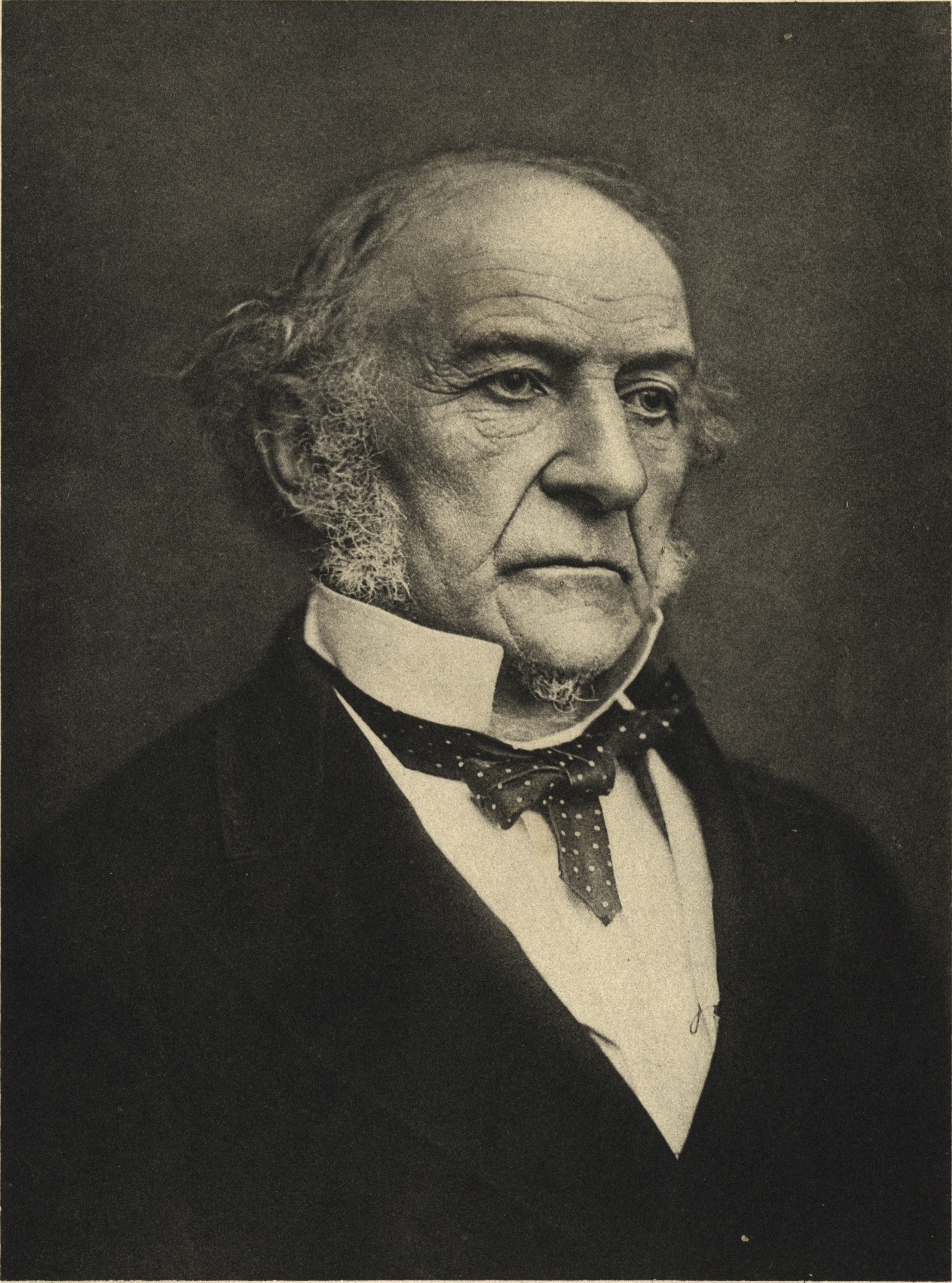
William Gladstone

- July 2 – John R. Goldsborough, United States Navy commodore (d. 1877)
- July 9 – Friedrich Gustav Jakob Henle, German-Jewish anatomist, physician (d. 1885)
- July 16 – Konstantin Bernhard von Voigts-Rhetz, Prussian general (d. 1877)
- July 31 – Francis Walker, English entomologist (d. 1874)
- August 6 – Alfred, Lord Tennyson, British poet (d. 1892)
- August 8 – Heinrich Abeken, German theologian (d. 1872)
- August 29 – Oliver Wendell Holmes Sr., American physician, writer (d. 1894)
- September 4 – Manuel Montt, 5th President of Chile (d. 1880)
- September 12 – Julius von Bose, Prussian general (d. 1894)
- November 4 – Benjamin Robbins Curtis, Associate Justice of the Supreme Court of the United States (d. 1874)
- November 10 – David Einhorn (rabbi), German-American abolitionist (d. 1879)
- November 20 – Gustav Koerner, German-born revolutionary, journalist, lawyer, politician, statesman of Illinois and Germany, Colonel of the U.S. Army (d. 1896)
- November 27 – Fanny Kemble, British-born American actress, writer (d. 1893)
- December 5
  - Edmond Le Bœuf, French general, Marshal of France (d. 1888)
  - Minna Planer, German actress (d. 1866)
- December 24 – Kit Carson, American frontiersman (d. 1868)
- December 29
  - George Washington Baines, American politician, journalist and educator (d. 1882)
  - William Ewart Gladstone, Prime Minister of the United Kingdom (d. 1898)
- December 30 – Wilhelm von Tümpling, Prussian general (d. 1884)

=== Date unknown ===
- Ștefan Golescu, 8th Prime Minister of Romania (d. 1874)

== Deaths ==
=== January–June ===
Joseph Haydn

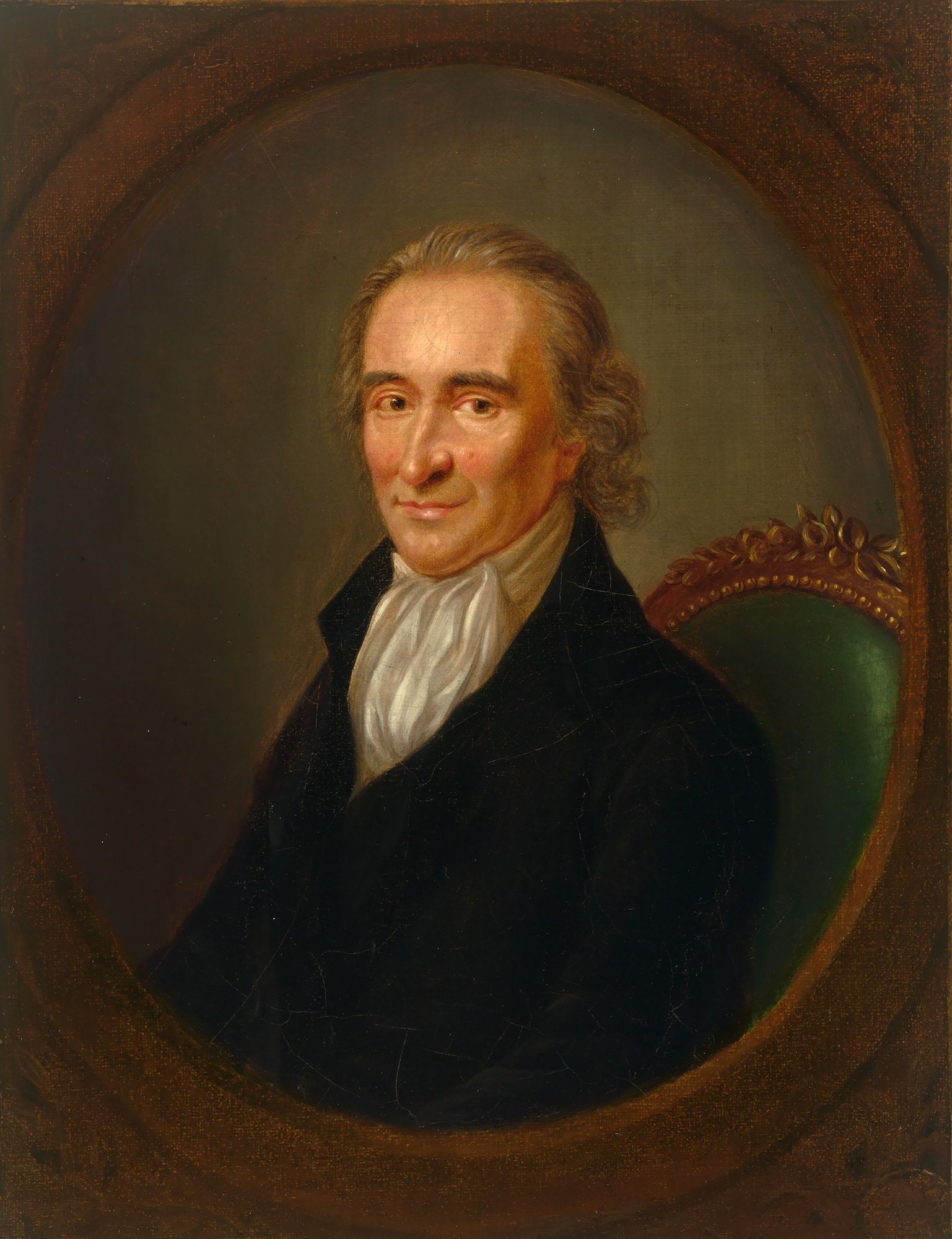
Thomas Paine

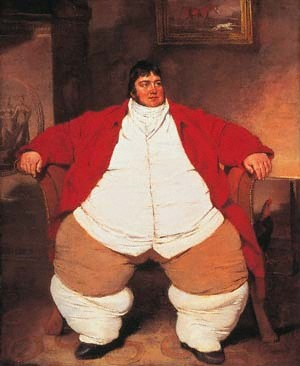
Daniel Lambert

- January 6 – Johann Augustus Eberhard, German theologian, philosopher (b. 1739)
- January 16 – John Moore, British general (killed in battle) (b. 1761)
- February 6 – Antoine Joseph Santerre, French general (b. 1752)
- February 20 – Richard Gough, English antiquary (b. 1735)
- February 25 – John Murray, 4th Earl of Dunmore (Lord Dunmore)(b. 1730)
- March 7 – Johann Georg Albrechtsberger, Austrian composer (b. 1736)
- March 11 – Hannah Cowley, English dramatist and poet (b. 1743)
- March 18 – Karoline Kaulla, German banker (b. 1739)
- March 20 – Mary Bateman, English woman executed for murder, known as the Yorkshire Witch
- March 25 – Anna Seward, English writer (b. 1747)
- March 27 – Joseph-Marie Vien, French painter (b. 1716)
- April 6 – Jean-Pierre Saint-Ours, Swiss artist (b. 1752)
- April 26 – Bernhard Schott, German music publisher (b. 1748)
- May 13 – Beilby Porteus, English bishop, abolitionist (b. 1731)
- May 17 – Leopold Auenbrugger, Austrian physician (b. 1722)
- May 24 – Charles Rainsford, British general (b. 1728)
- May 29 – Johannes von Müller, Swiss historian (b. 1752)
- May 31
  - Joseph Haydn, Austrian classical composer (b. 1732)
  - Jean Lannes, French marshal (mortally wounded in battle (b. 1769)
- June 4 – Nicolai Abildgaard, Danish painter (b. 1743)
- June 8 – Thomas Paine, American revolutionary writer (b. 1737)
- June 15 – Sir George Baker, 1st Baronet, British physician (b. 1722)
- June 21 – Daniel Lambert, English jail keeper and animal breeder, famous for his unusually large size (b. 1770)

=== July–December ===
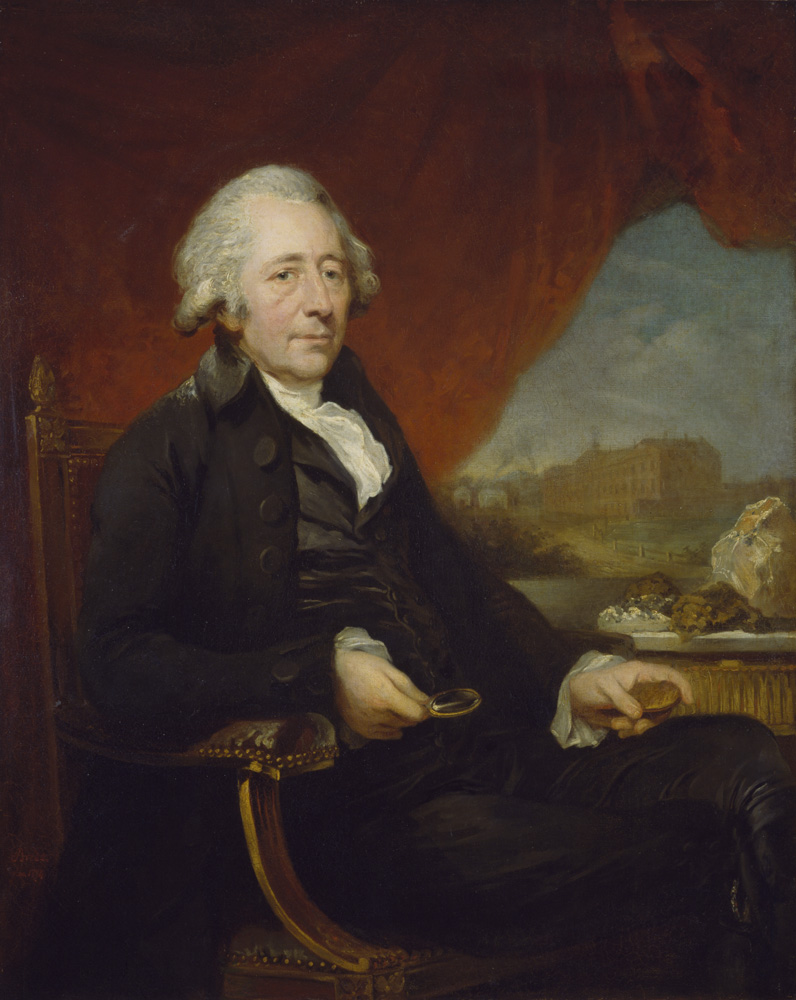
Matthew Boulton

- July 6 – Antoine Charles Louis de Lasalle, French cavalry general (killed in battle) (b. 1775)
- July 22 – Jean Senebier, Swiss pastor, botanist (b. 1742)
- August 8 – Ueda Akinari, Japanese author, scholar (b. 1734)
- August 18 – Matthew Boulton, English manufacturer, engineer (b. 1728)
- August 29 – Lucy Barnes, American writer (b. 1780)
- September 1 – Johann Friedrich August Göttling, German chemist (b. 1753)
- September 3 – George Coventry, 6th Earl of Coventry, English noble and politician (b. 1722)
- September 7
  - Buddha Yodfa Chulaloke (Rama I), King of Siam, founder of the Chakri dynasty of Thailand (b. 1737)
  - Caroline Schelling, German scholar (b. 1763)
- October 8 – James Elphinston, Scottish philologist (b. 1721)
- October 11 – Meriwether Lewis, American explorer (suicide) (b. 1774)
- October 30 – William Cavendish-Bentinck, 3rd Duke of Portland, Prime Minister of the United Kingdom (b. 1738)
- November 28 – Jakob Heinrich Laspeyres, German lepidopterist (b. 1769)
- December 16 – Antoine François, comte de Fourcroy, French chemist (b. 1755)
