= Proserpine =

Proserpine may refer to:

- Proserpina, the Roman goddess of springtime and wife of Pluto

== Arts and entertainment ==
- Proserpine (Lully), a 1680 opera by Jean-Baptiste Lully
- Proserpine (Paisiello), an 1803 opera by Giovanni Paisiello
- Proserpine (play), an 1820 verse drama by Mary Shelley and Percy Bysshe Shelley
- Proserpine (Saint-Saëns), an 1887 drame lyrique by Camille Saint-Saëns
- Proserpine (Rossetti), a c. 1868 painting by Dante Gabriel Rossetti

== Places ==
- Proserpine, Queensland, a town in Queensland, Australia
  - Proserpine Airport, or Whitsunday Coast Airport
  - Proserpine Cemetery
  - Proserpine Hospital
- Proserpine River, a river in Queensland, Australia

== Ships ==
- French ship Proserpine, any one of several ships of the French Navy
- HMS Proserpine, any one of several ships of the Royal Navy
- USS Proserpine, a United States Navy Achelous-class landing craft repair ship commissioned in 1945

== See also ==
- Proserpin (Kraus), a 1781 opera by Joseph Martin Kraus
- Proserpina (disambiguation)
- Prosperine, Missouri
