= HMS Proserpine =

Several Royal Navy ships have borne the name HMS Proserpine:

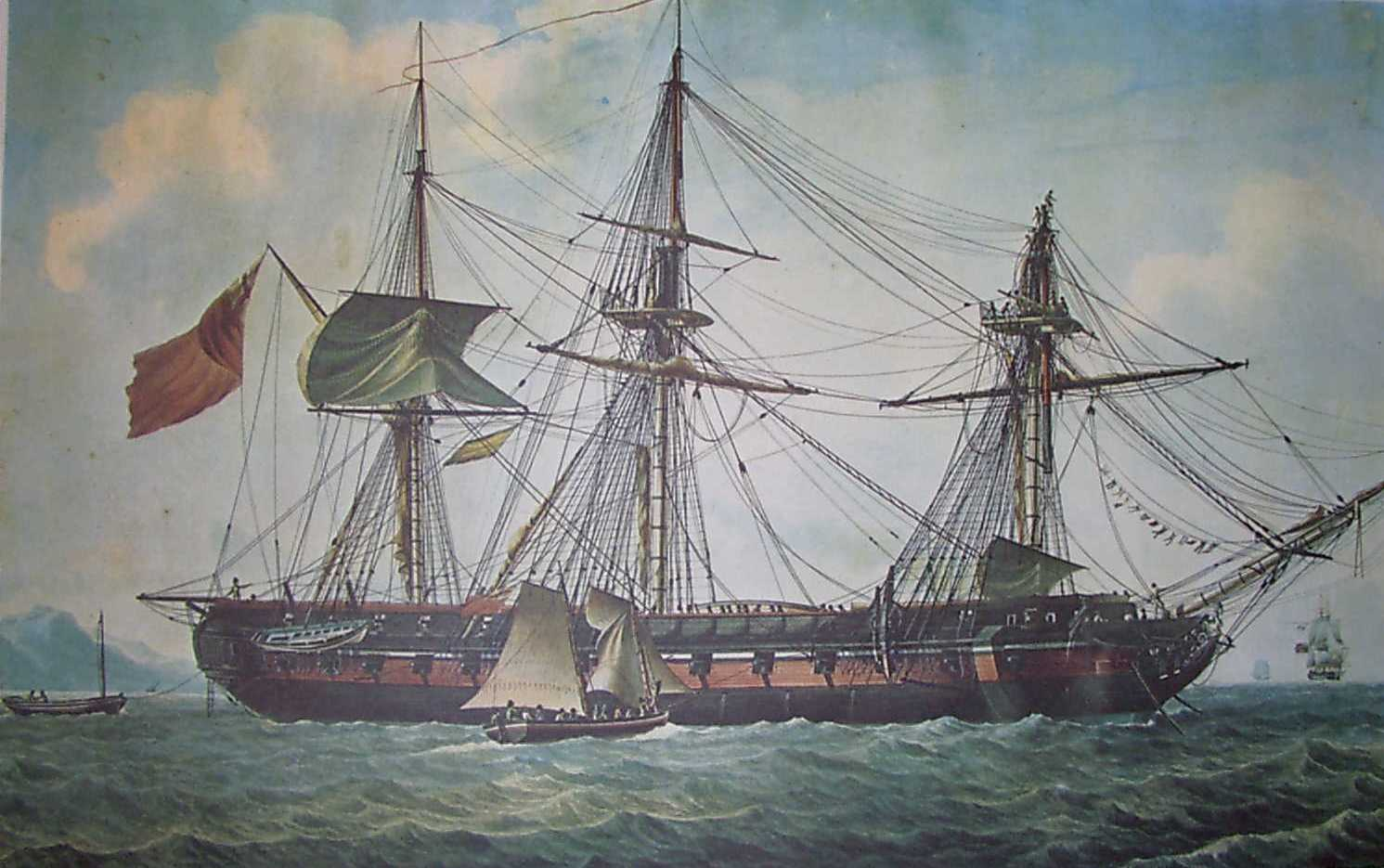
HMS Proserpine (1807)

- HMS Proserpine (1756) was a sloop purchased in 1756 and captured by France later that year.
- HMS Proserpine (1757) was a fireship purchased in 1757 and sold in 1763.
- HMS Proserpine (1777) was a sixth-rate frigate wrecked in a snowstorm on 1 February 1799 on Scharhörn Sand near Newark Island in the Elbe with the loss of 14 of her crew. After she had been abandoned, several crew members returned to her and refloated her on 10 February but she grounded again on Baltrum Island.
- HMS Proserpine (1798) was the French frigate Bellone, which HMS Ethalion captured on 12 October 1798 and which the Royal Navy took into service as a 36-gun fifth-rate frigate. She was hulked in 1799 and sold for breaking up in 1806.
- HMS Proserpine (1807) was an Amphion-class frigate launched in 1807. While she lay off Toulon on 27 February 1809, the French frigates Pénélope and Pauline captured her in the action of 27 February 1809.
- HMS Proserpine (1830) was a 46-gun fifth rate sold in 1860.
- HMS Proserpine (1896) was a Pelorus-class cruiser built in 1896 and scrapped in 1919.
- HMS Proserpine, a shore naval base at Lyness in Orkney used by Scapa Flow in World War II.

== See also ==
- French ship Proserpine
