= French ship Proserpine =

Five ships of the French Navy have borne the name of Proserpine, in honour of Proserpina.

== French ships named Proserpine ==
- French ship Proserpine (1697), a bomb ship, lead ship of her class
- French ship Proserpine (1756), a fireship
- French frigate Proserpine (1785), a Hébé-class frigate captured by the Royal Navy in the action of 13 June 1796 and taken in British service as HMS Amelia
- French ship Proserpine (1797), a Venetian galley
- French frigate Proserpine (1809), an Amphion-class frigate captured from the Royal Navy in the action of 27 February 1809
Ships of the French Navy named Proserpine
HMS "Amelia" Chasing the French Frigate "Aréthuse" 1813. Painted in 1852 by John Christian Schetky, representing Proserpine (1785) after her capture by the Royal Navy

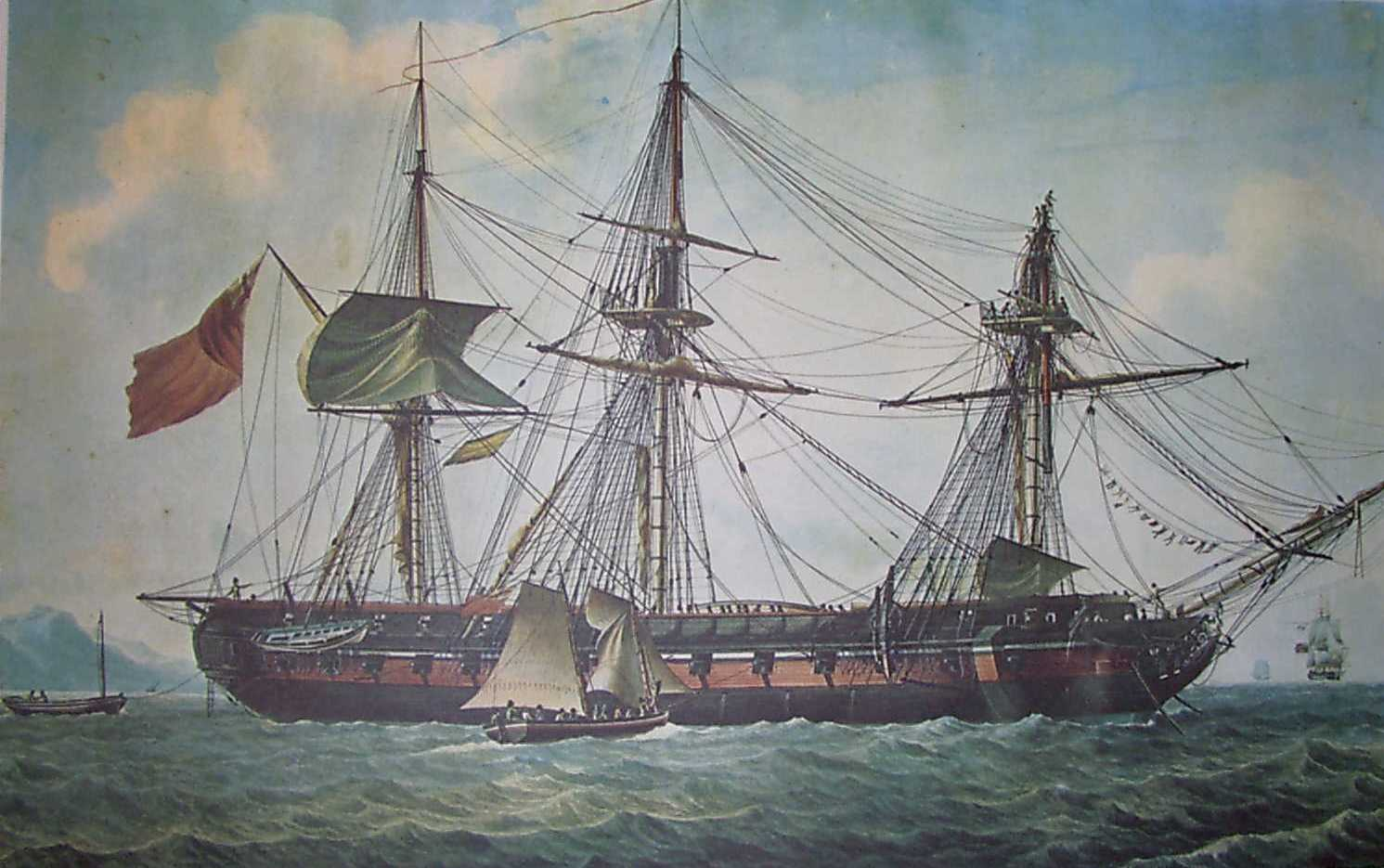
Portrait of Proserpine (1809) by Antoine Roux, after her capture in the action of 27 February 1809 (the mizzen-mast was actually cut away three metres above the deck)

== See also ==
- HMS Proserpine

== Notes and references ==
=== Bibliography ===
- Roche, Jean-Michel (2005). Dictionnaire des bâtiments de la flotte de guerre française de Colbert à nos jours. Vol. 1. Group Retozel-Maury Millau. p. 364. ISBN 978-2-9525917-0-6. OCLC 165892922.
