= Proserpina (disambiguation) =

Proserpina is the Roman goddess of springtime and wife of Pluto.

Proserpina may also refer to:

- Proserpina (gastropod), a genus of land snails in the family Proserpinidae
- Proserpina Dam, a Roman gravity dam in Badajoz, Extremadura, Spain
- 26 Proserpina, an asteroid discovered in 1853
- Proserpina, an 1879 book by John Ruskin about wayside flowers
- "Proserpina", a 2012 song by Martha Wainwright from Come Home to Mama
- Spanish ship Proserpina, more than one Spanish Navy ship

== See also ==
- Proserpin (Kraus), a 1781 opera by Joseph Martin Kraus
- Proserpine
