= HMS Enterprise (1774) =

Enterprise-class Royal Navy frigate

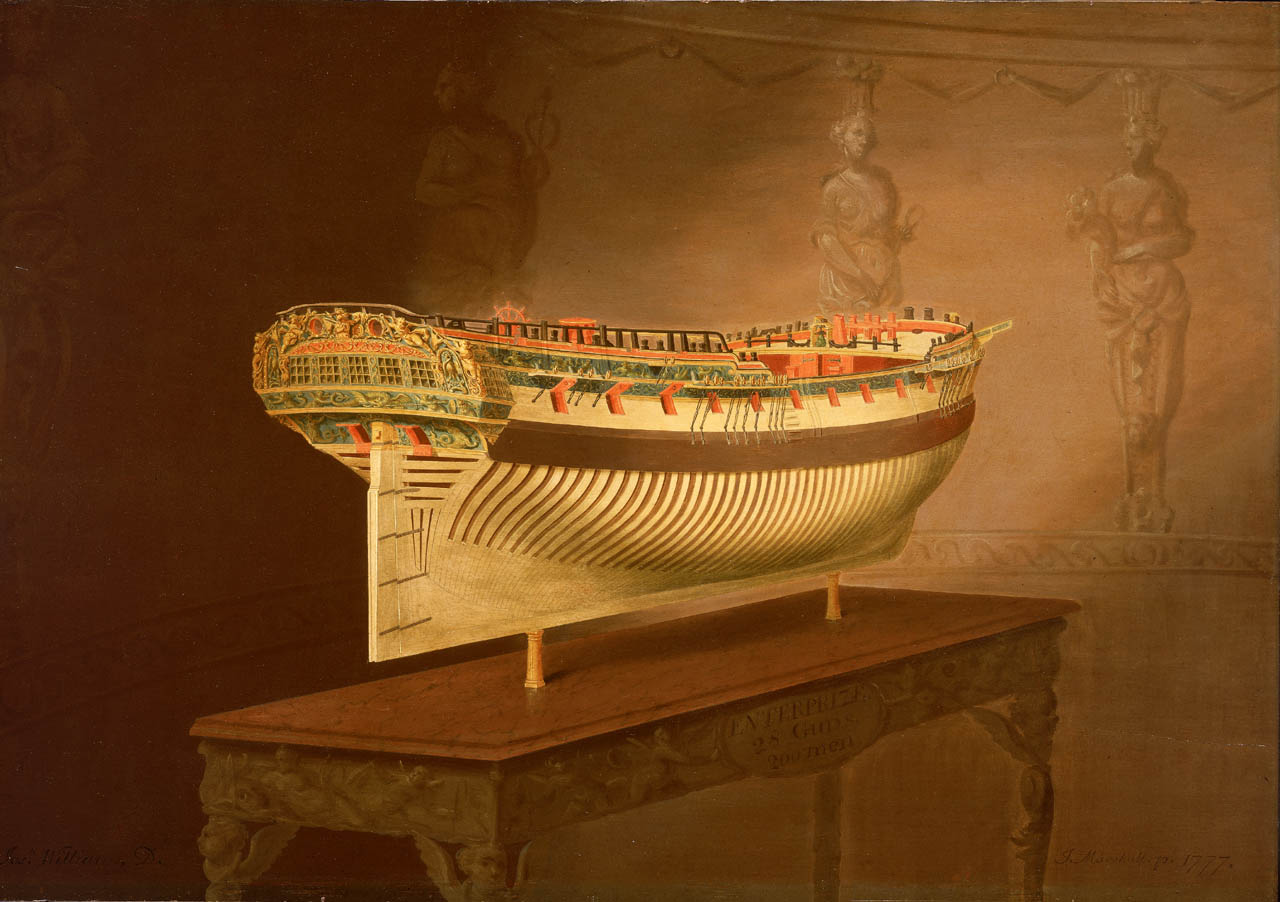
- Painting of the hull model of HMS Enterprise by Joseph Marshall, 1777

History

Great Britain
- Name: HMS Enterprise
- Ordered: January 1771
- Builder: Deptford Royal Dockyard
- Laid down: 9 September 1771
- Launched: 24 August 1774
- Completed: 20 June 1775
- Commissioned: April 1775
- Fate: Broken up, August 1807

General characteristics
- Class & type: Enterprise-class frigate
- Tons burthen: 593 89/94 (bm)
- Length: 120 ft 6 in (36.73 m) (gundeck); 99 ft 6 in (30.33 m) (keel)
- Beam: 33 ft 6 in (10.21 m)
- Depth of hold: 11 ft 0 in (3.35 m)
- Sail plan: Full-rigged ship
- Complement: 200 officers and men
- Armament: Gundeck: 24 × 9-pounder guns; QD: 4 × 3-pounder guns

HMS Enterprise (historically spelled Enterprize) was a 28-gun sixth-rate Enterprise-class frigate of the Royal Navy. She was the name ship of her class of twenty-seven ships.

== Construction ==
Enterprise was built at Deptford Royal Dockyard, England, launched in August 1774, and was commissioned in April 1775 under the command of Captain Sir Thomas Rich. During her construction she was also the subject of a pair of oil paintings by Joseph Marshall, simulating her ship model but actually drawn from her designs - these were completed in 1777 as part of a series of such paintings commissioned by George III of the United Kingdom. The pair showing Enterprise are now split between the National Maritime Museum and the Science Museum.

== Career ==
Enterprise served throughout the American Revolutionary War as cruiser and convoy escort. She captured a prize off Cape Henry on 19 July 1778. On 7 June 1780, Enterprise, under command of Captain Patrick Leslie (not to be confused with Patrick Leslie), was at anchor in the Bay of Gibraltar with other ships of the Royal Navy. At about 1:30am, Enterprise saw some vessels drifting toward the harbour. When they came within hailing distance, the seaman on watch called a challenge. The six drifting vessels were set afire by their crews, who made their escape in small boats, leaving the flaming hulks drifting toward the British ships. Captain Leslie fired a three-gun salvo to warn the other ships, cut his anchor lines to let Enterprise drift away from the hulks, and then opened fire on the hulks in an attempt to sink them. With the Spanish fleet waiting just outside the harbour for any British ships trying to escape, the British seamen took to small boats and, at great peril to their lives, boarded the flaming hulks to attach lines to pull them away from their own ships and burn themselves out.

After this action and continued service in the Mediterranean, she sailed under the command of Captain John Payne on 27 April 1782, for the Leeward Islands in the Caribbean. In October 1782, now under the command of Captain William Carnegie, she captured the 22-gun American privateer Mohawk, which the Royal Navy took into service under her existing name, before selling her in 1783.

== Fate ==
Enterprise was decommissioned in May 1784. From 1790, she was stationed in port in British home waters as a receiving ship, monitoring the arrival of foreign vessels. In 1791, during the war scare known as the Spanish Armament, she was hulked as a receiving ship for impressed men at the Tower of London. In 1806, she was taken to Deptford and broken up in 1807.

In April 1806, another Enterprise-class frigate, HMS Resource (built at Rotherhithe in 1777–78) joined her sister ship at the Tower as another receiving ship to accommodate men taken up by another press at the end of the Peace of Amiens and the outbreak of the Napoleonic War. Resource was renamed Enterprise; she was broken up in 1816.
