= Mohawk (1781 ship) =

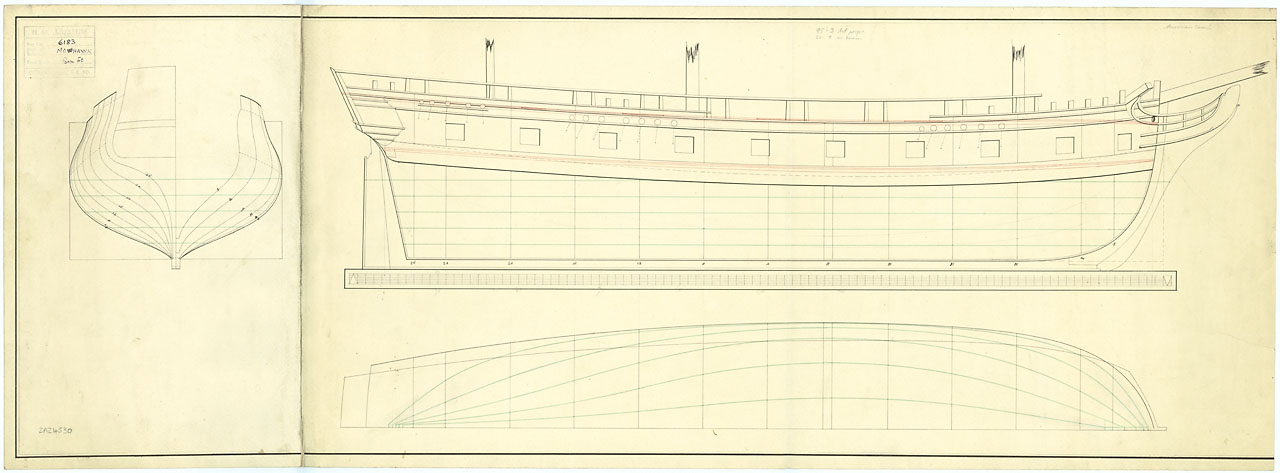
- Mohawk

History

Massachusetts
- Name: Mohawk
- Namesake: Mohawk people
- Builder: Beverly, Massachusetts, or Philadelphia
- Launched: 1781
- Home port: Beverly, Massachusetts
- Captured: October 1782

Great Britain
- Name: HMS Mohawk
- Acquired: October 1782 by capture
- Fate: Sold 1783

Great Britain
- Name: Mohawk
- Owner: Various; 1795:Sidenham Teast & Co.
- Acquired: 1783 by purchase
- Home port: Bristol
- Captured: July 1801

France
- Name: Mohawk
- Acquired: July 1801 by capture
- Fate: Sold June 1814

General characteristics
- Tons burthen: 130, (Note: This is likely a gross underestimate, probably given to reduce any assessment.) c.280, 28486/94 (bm)
- Length: 95 ft 3 in (29.0 m) (gundeck); 77 ft 3 in (23.5 m) (keel)
- Beam: 26 ft 4 in (8.0 m)
- Depth of hold: 16 ft 10 in (5.1 m)
- Complement: Mohawk: 30, or 50 (second voyage); HMS Mohawk: Unknown; 1795:25; 1797: 100; 1800: 40; French service: 148
- Armament: Mohawk: 20 × 6-pounder guns; HMS Mohawk: 14 guns; 1795:12; 1797: 25 × 3-, 6-, & 9-pounder guns + 1 swivel gun; 1800: 22 × 3- & 4-pounder guns; French service: 16 × 12-pounder + 4 × 6-pounder guns

Mohawk (or Mohawke) was a ship launched at Beverly, Massachusetts in 1781. She became a privateer, making two voyages. In 1782, the Royal Navy captured her and briefly took her into service under her existing name before selling her in 1783. She then became a merchantman until some investors in Bristol bought her in 179,6 and turned her into a privateer again. In 1799, she became a letter of marque, but the French Navy captured her in 1801. She then served in the French Navy, capturing a British privateer in 1805, and was sold in 1814.

== American privateer and capture ==
William Leach, William Bartlett, and other merchants of Beverly, Massachusetts, applied for a commission for Elias Smith as commander of the ship Mohawk, which they received on 8 November 1781. Mohawk was a new ship, built especially for privateering.

On her first cruise Mohawk sent three prizes into Martinique. Lloyd's List of 7 June 1782, reported that in the latitude of Barbados, Mohawk had captured the Adventure, Ingram or Bodkin, master, which had been sailing from Quebec to the West Indies. Mohawk took Adventure into Martinique. Adventure's captain and boatswain arrived at Barbados in a cartel on 19 April. Mohawk also sent one prize, the ship Daniel, formerly the Salem Packet, into Beverly. Mohawk had captured Daniel, Benjamin Bickford, master, as she was homeward bound from Bilbao.

Captain John Carnes, of Beverly, replaced Smith. He sailed on 6 September 1782, but the cruise was short-lived. On 5 October 1782, HMS Enterprise, Captain John Payne, captured Mohawk off Cape Ann. Mohawk was armed with 20 guns and had 106 or 108 men aboard. Enterprise landed her prisoners at Sandy Hook on 13 October. Two days later, Captain John Payne of Enterprise libeled Mohawk in the Vice-Admiralty Court at New York.

== HMS Mohawk ==
The Royal Navy purchased Mohawk immediately after her capture, and in November had her hull coppered at Antigua. A draught of Mohawk's lines shows her as having ten gun ports on each side of her gun-deck, and nine ports on each side in the bulwarks of what is apparently a continuous upper deck.

The Navy then commissioned her in the Leeward Islands as a 14-gun sloop under Commander Robert Sutton. He sailed her to Great Britain, arriving at Deptford on 8 August 1783. The Navy never added her to the Navy List and instead sold her on 25 September, for £1,120 to Samuel Scott.

== Mohawk ==
Mohawk, of 280 tons (bm), and built in New England in 1781, entered Lloyd's Register in 1784, with J. Griffiths, master, and Scott & Co. owner. Her trade was London-Africa. She had been coppered in 1782.

Captain John Griffith sailed from London on 13 March 1784, to acquire enslaved people on the Gold Coast. Mohawk acquired enslaved people first in the Sierra Leone estuary, and then at Cape Coast Castle. She sailed from Africa on 9 May 1785, and arrived at Kingston, Jamaica on 11 July, with 350 enslaved people. She sailed from Kingston on 16 August, and arrived back at London on 13 October.

Lloyd's Register for 1786, showed a change of ownership from Scott & Co. to St Barbe & Co., London. Her trade changed from London-Africa to London-Smyrna. Her master's name changed too, but is illegible.

In 1787, Lloyd's List reported that Mohawk was in Leghorn, from Smyrna. It gave her master's name as "J. Mooring".

The 1789 Lloyd's Register gave Mohawk's origin as "New England", before changing it to "Philadelphia". Her master was J. Moring, her owner St Barbe, and her trade was London-Smyrna. The register did give her burthen as 204 tons (bm), but that is almost certainly a typo.

In 1789, Lloyd's List reported that on 21 October, Mohawk had put into Malta in a hard gale of wind, and had sailed on 27 October. Her master was still J. Mooring.

On 10 August 1795, Mohawk, American-built, of 284 tons, Thomas King, master, left Bristol for the West African coast. (There is no record to suggest that this voyage was for the purposes of acquiring enslaved people.) She reached the Gold Coast and Anamabue (19–22 January 1796), Gabon (1 March), Bassau (24–29 March), Cape Mount (3–14 April), Isle de Los (c. 16 April), and Sierra Leone (17 April to 7 June). She then sailed directly back to Bristol, arriving 10 June.

In 1796, her owners offered Mohawk for sale by auction on 24 November, at the Exchange Coffee House. The advertisement described her as of 285 tons (bm), but gave measurements that are at variance with those the Royal Navy took. The advertisement noted that she was pierced for 20 guns on her main deck and had most of her cannon. It also pointed out that in 1795, she had undergone a thorough repair, and that she was coppered and copper fastened. The advertisement suggested that she was fast and an excellent sea boat, perfectly suited to privateering.

Her buyers fitted her out in January 1797, as a privateer. James Baker, received a letter of marque on 5 January 1797, for the ship Mohawk, of 100 men, and twenty-five 3, 6, and 9-pounder cannon and one swivel gun. She then sailed for the Cape Verde Islands on 25 March. On her way she encountered a French corvette of 20 guns. The two vessels exchanged fire for an hour and a half before the French vessel disengaged. Mohawk had one man wounded and some damage to her sails and rigging.

On 25 August 1797, Lloyd's List reported that Mohawk, Baker, master, had put into St Jago with prizes, Spanish vessels carrying a cargo of fish. These were two brigs. Mohawk returned to Bristol on 30 October. Her owners must have been dissatisfied with their investment because they put her up for sale in November at Trent's Floating Dock.

The 1799, Lloyd's Register listed Mohawk's master as "Kempthorn", her burthen as 284 tons (bm), her owner as "Hunters", and her trade as Bristol to Naples. James Kempthorne received a letter of marque on 20 November 1800. This letter gave her burthen as 296 tons (bm), her complement as 40 men, and her armament as twenty 4, 6, and 9-pounder guns. The reduction in crew size is indicative that Mohawk's primary objective would now be trade, not privateering. In June 1800, an advertisement appeared stating that Mohawk, Captain James Kempthorne, was prepared to sail in 10 days, without convoy, for Palermo and Naples.

The 1800 and 1801, Lloyd's Registers repeated the information from 1799, but gave her name as Mohawke, added an armament of twenty-two 3 and 4-pounder guns, and gave her burthen as 284 tons (bm).

On 27 March 1800, Mowhawk had a brush with a 14-gun French ship in the Bay of Biscay.

== Capture and French naval service ==
On 24 June 1801, a squadron under Admiral Ganteaume was on an unsuccessful mission to bring troops to Egypt when it encountered HMS Swiftsure, Captain Benjamin Hallowell, and captured her. In his report on the loss of his vessel, Hallowell also reported that the French squadron had, on 4 July, captured the letter-of-marque Mohawk between Lampedusa and Pantelleria as she was sailing between Bristol and Malta with general merchandise. On 6 October 1801, Lloyd's List reported that she had been captured while sailing from Bristol to Malta and that Kempthorne was at Toulon.

The French Navy commissioned Mohawk at Toulon, under her existing name, and effective from the date of her capture, initially under Poncel.

Between 3 December 1801, and 29 January 1803, during the Peace of Amiens, Mohawk was under the command of lieutenant de vaisseau Joseph-Antoine Ganteaume. She carried dispatches and passengers from Cap-François to Rochefort, Charente-Maritime.

Ganteaume, promoted to capitaine de frégate on 6 March 1805, was still in command of Mohawk on 23 to 24 May 1805, when she captured a British privateer named Neptune, off Cap Roux (between Frejus and Cannes). Ganteaume took command of Proserpine on 1 April 1809, and command of Mohawk then passed to lieutenant de vaisseau Lecrosnier. (Note: Alternatively spelled "Le Crosnier".)

On 13 February 1812, Mohawk, under the command of lieutenant de vaisseau Lecrosnier, was escorting the fluyt Mérinos from Livorno to Sagone, Corsica, along with Alacrity, under Lieutenant Baron de Mackau. They were off Cap Corse when they encountered HMS Apollo. Apollo gave chase and overhauled Mérinos, which struck after firing a token broadside. Becalmed, Mohawk launched her boats and attempted to have them tow her closer to the battle, but after seeing the surrender of Mérinos, abandoned the attempt and escaped. Apollo gave chase and exchanged fire with Mohawk for two hours before giving up and sailing back to her prize. Mohawk then arrived at Saint-Florent.

Captain Bridges Taylor, of Apollo described Mérinos as a relatively new frigate-built storeship of 850 tons, pierced for 36 guns but carrying only twenty 8-pounders. She had a crew of 126 men under the command of captaine de frégate Honoré Coardonan, holder of the Légion d'Honneur. She was on her way to Sagone for timber. The French lost six killed and 20 wounded; the British, despite also coming under fire from the shore, suffered no casualties. Captain Gourdouan was court-martialled and acquitted of the loss of his ship.

Taylor further reported that although Mérinos had signaled to her escort, Mohawk had sailed away. Taylor reported that Mohawk was a British ship that had been captured in 1799, and that she had a crew of about 130 men, plus some conscripts.

== Fate ==
Mowhawk was decommissioned at Toulon and ordered sold on 16 June 1814.
