= French frigate Pénélope (1806) =

Frigate of the French Imperial Navy

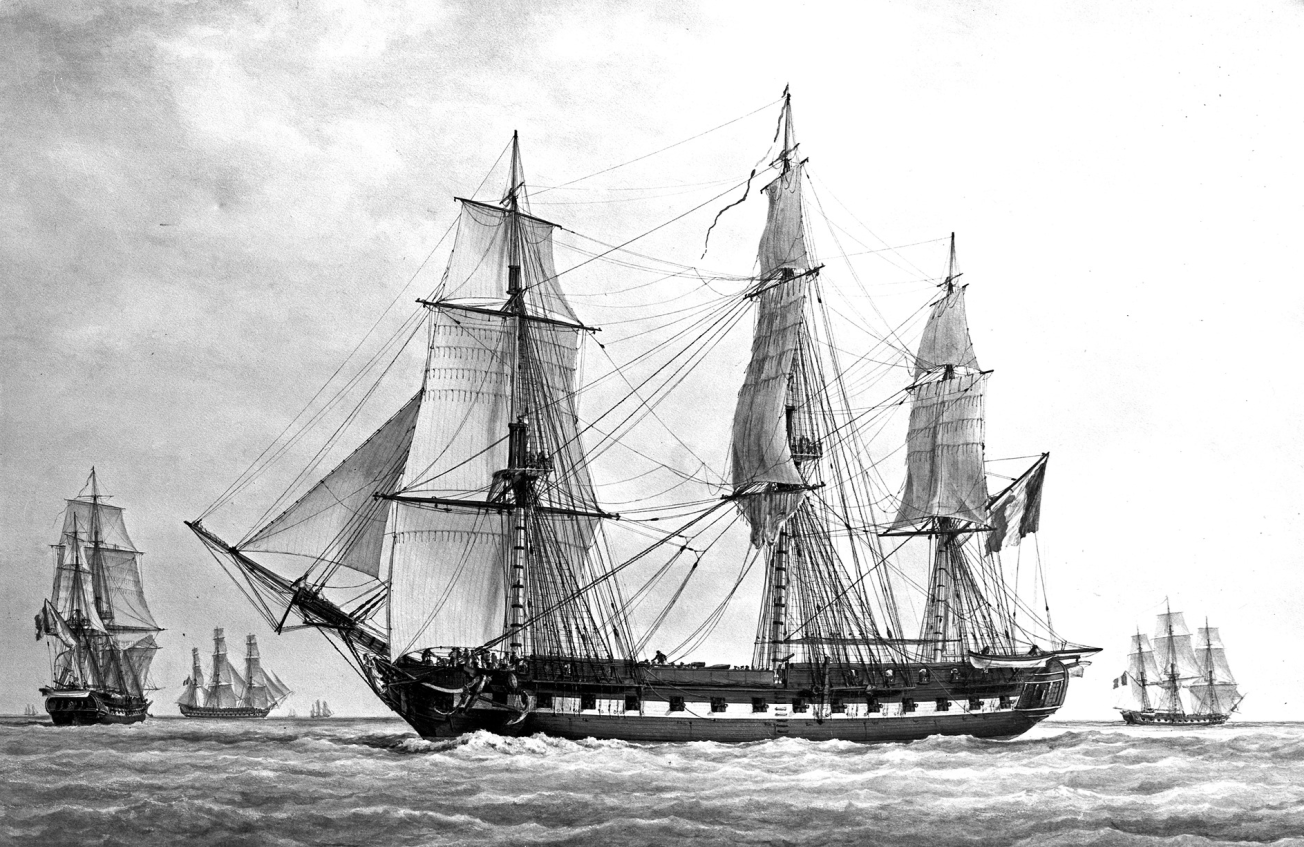
- Painting of Pénélope by François Geoffroi Roux

History

France
- Name: Pénélope
- Namesake: Penelope
- Ordered: 22 August 1803
- Builder: Bordeaux
- Laid down: 12 February 1804
- Launched: 28 October 1806
- Commissioned: 6 November 1806
- Decommissioned: 1828
- Fate: Sold for scrap 1828

General characteristics
- Class & type: Armide-class frigate
- Displacement: 1430 tonneaux
- Tons burthen: 759 port tonneaux
- Length: 47 m (154 ft)
- Beam: 12 m (39 ft)
- Draught: 5.5 m (18 ft)
- Propulsion: Sail
- Complement: 339
- Armament: 28 × 18-pounder long guns; 8 × 8-pounders; 8 × 36-pounder carronades

Pénélope was a 44-gun Armide-class frigate of the French Imperial Navy. Commissioned under Captain Bernard Dubourdieu in November 1806, Pénélope served in the Atlantic for several months. On 21 January 1808, along with Thémis, she departed Bordeaux for a cruise to Toulon. They arrived on 28 March, having captured 12 British ships en route, including the privateer Sirene. On 1 January 1809, command of Pénélope was transferred to Captain Simonot. In the action of 27 February 1809, she and Pauline captured HMS Proserpine. Pénélope later took part in the action of 5 November 1813. Pénélope was decommissioned on 31 August 1815 during the Bourbon Restoration in France and was sold for scrap in 1828.

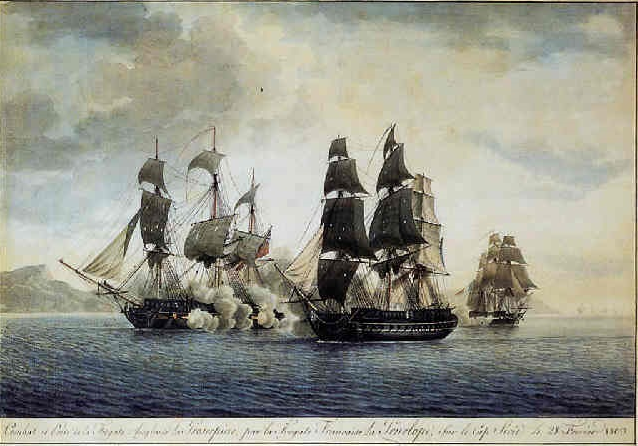
Capture of HMS Proserpine by Pénélope and Pauline. Watercolour by Antoine Roux.

== Sources and references ==
- Roche, Jean-Michel (2005). Dictionnaire des bâtiments de la flotte de guerre française de Colbert à nos jours 1 1671–1870. p. 345. ISBN 978-2-9525917-0-6. OCLC 165892922.
