= Bernard Dubourdieu =

French Navy officer (1773–1811)

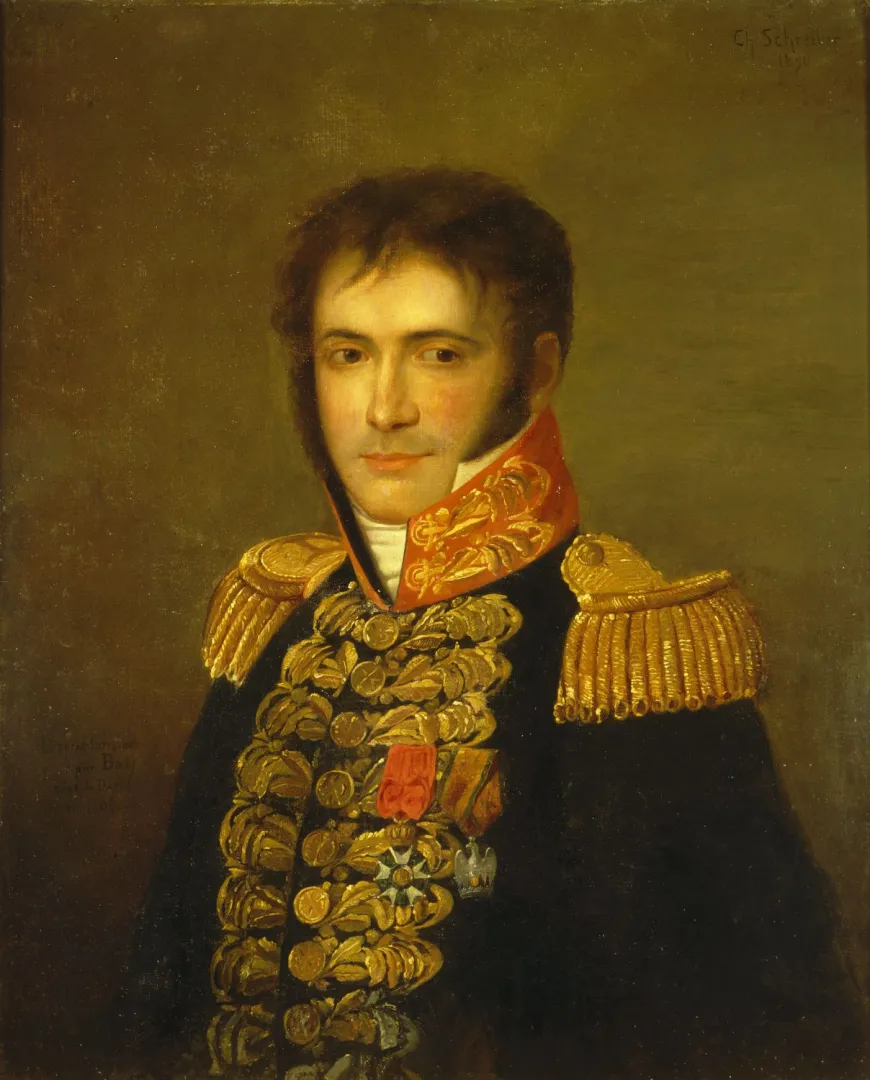
- Portrait by Charles-Baptiste Schreiber, 1890
- Born: 28 March 1773; Bayonne, France
- Died: 13 March 1811 (aged 38); Kingdom of Slavonia, Austrian Empire
- Military career
- Allegiance: French First Republic; First French Empire
- Branch: French Navy; French Imperial Navy
- Rank: Counter admiral
- Conflicts: Napoleonic Wars; Action of 27 February 1809; Battle of Lissa (1811) †

Counter-Admiral Bernard Dubourdieu (28 April 1773 – 13 March 1811) was a French Navy officer who led a Franco-Italian fleet at the Battle of Lissa in 1811, during which he was killed in action.

== Life ==
A native of Bayonne, Dubourdieu started sailing on a merchantman at 16, before joining the Navy in 1792. He quickly rose to ensign aboard the Entreprenant. He transferred to the frigate Topaze the next year in Latouche-Tréville's squadron.

Captured at Toulon by the British and transferred to Gibraltar, he escaped to Lorient. Promoted to enseigne de vaisseau, Dubourdieu sailed on the corvette Gaieté. Gaieté was captured and Dubourdieu was imprisoned again until 1799.

Captured a third time in Alexandria in 1800, he was exchanged and promoted to lieutenant de vaisseau. In 1805, he was made a capitaine de frégate. In 1807, he took command of the frigate Pénélope and captured thirteen British merchantmen. In the action of 27 February 1809, along with the frigate Pauline, he captured HMS Proserpine blockading Toulon.

On 23 October 1810, he raided Lissa and captured six ships in the harbour. He was then tasked to capture the island and establish a base there. Promoted to contre-amiral, Dubourdieu set sail with six frigates. In the ensuing Battle of Lissa, the French were routed and Dubourdieu was killed.
