= Spanish ship Proserpina =

Various Spanish Navy ships

Three ships of the Spanish Navy have borne the name Proserpina, for Proserpina, the goddess of spring and wife of Pluto in Roman mythology:

- Proserpina, a 40-gun frigate launched in 1797 and scrapped in 1820.
- Proserpina, a 10-to-14-gun schooner commissioned in 1809 that sank in 1821.
- Proserpina, a Furor-class destroyer in commission from 1898 to 1931.
