= Action of 27 February 1809 =

1809 battle of the Napoleonic Wars

- Part of the Napoleonic Wars
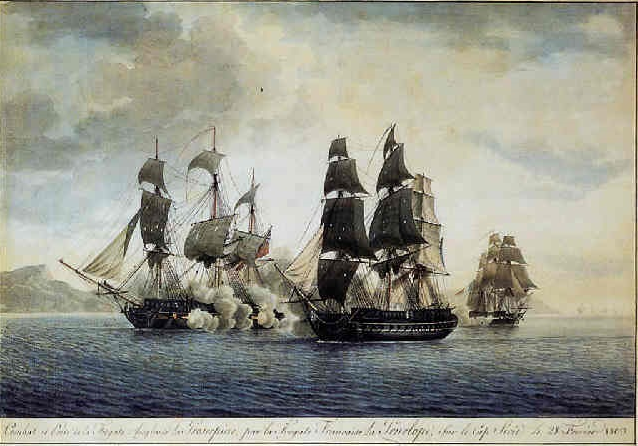
- Illustration of the battle by Antoine Roux
Date	27 February 1809
Location	12 nautical miles (22 km) off Toulon, Mediterranean Sea
Result	French victory

Belligerents
France	United Kingdom

Commanders and leaders
Bernard Dubourdieu; François-Gilles Montfort	Charles Otter

Strength
2 frigates	1 frigate

Casualties and losses
None	1 killed 12 wounded 1 frigate captured

The action of 27 February 1809 was a minor naval engagement of the Napoleonic Wars. Two French frigates, Pénélope and Pauline, sortied from Toulon harbour to chase a British frigate, HMS Proserpine, which was conducting surveillance of French movements. First sneaking undetected and later trying to pass herself as a British frigate coming to relieve Proserpine, Pénélope approached within gun range before being identified. With the help of Pauline, she attacked Proserpine and forced her to strike her colours after a one-hour fight. Proserpine was sailed to Toulon and commissioned into the French Navy, where she served until 1865. Proserpine's captain Charles Otter remained a prisoner in France until the end of the War of the Sixth Coalition in 1814; he was court-martialled for the loss of his ship on 30 May 1814 and honourably acquitted.

== Background ==
By 1809, the French fleet in Toulon was blockaded by several British squadrons of powerful ships of the line; direct surveillance of the harbour, however, had to be conducted by smaller and more agile frigates. Threatening intervention from the battle squadrons against ships putting out to sea, the presence of the British frigates constricted the liberty of manoeuver of the French ships, preventing not only an all-out sortie, but also navigation of individual ships or small squadrons, and even the training manoeuvers necessary to maintain the fleet. Consequently, French commanders tried to drive off British ships in order to disrupt the surveillance.

In February, the 32-gun (Note: Rated as a 40-gun by the French after her capture (Troude, p.64)) frigate HMS Proserpine, under Captain Charles Otter, was patrolling off Toulon. Having noticed that she tended to sail very close to Toulon, up to Cape Sicié, and learning from fishermen who had been in contact with her crew that she would be relieved at her station around the 27th, Captain Dubourdieu requested from Admiral Ganteaume authorisation to give chase; although under order to avoid engaging the British squadrons, Ganteaume authorised the sortie, joining Pauline, under François-Gilles Montfort, to Dubourdieu's Pénélope. He furthermore ordered two 74-guns, Suffren and Ajax, under Rear-admiral Baudin, to cover the frigates. (Note: Marshall (p.555) furthermore mentions the presence of Pomone, possibly accompanying the two 74s.)

== Battle ==
Pénélope and Pauline sneaked out of Toulon around 19:00, under a light East-North-East wind. Approaching unseen on the background of the coast, they reached Proserpine around 04.00, as she was cruising 12 miles off Cape Sicié. Suddenly detecting two large ships nearby, Proserpine, almost becalmed, tried to evade and identify her opponents to no avail. Seeing Proserpine challenge him with codes, Dubourdieu ordered the same number of signals to be raised and quickly lowered, as to confuse the British into wondering whether he was another British frigate coming to relieve her and having merely made a mistake in his answer. Pénélope arrived on the starboard side of Proserpine, " looking very large, her ports all up, lights on the main-deck fore and aft: she had shortened sail, and was perfectly ready for commencing the action", while Pauline took position on the port side.

Captain Otter hailed the frigates, who answered by firing a single shot. (Note: As it was considered to be a valid ruse of war to sail under a false flag until engaging an enemy, it was common practice to fire a single gun shot when rising one's colours: the token shot constituted a symbolic battle and confirmed that the flag currently being flown was real. The act is called assurer son pavillon.) The ships began trading broadsides, Pénélope gaining an initial advantage by raking her opponent with a triple-shot broadside. After one hour, Proserpine had her rigging and hull seriously damaged, and was in danger of being boarded. Her Mizzen-mast was cut three metres above the deck, and she had also lost her main top spar.

Seeing his ship unable to flee and two 74-gun ships approaching, Otter consulted with his officers and struck his colours, surrendering at 05:15.

== Aftermath ==
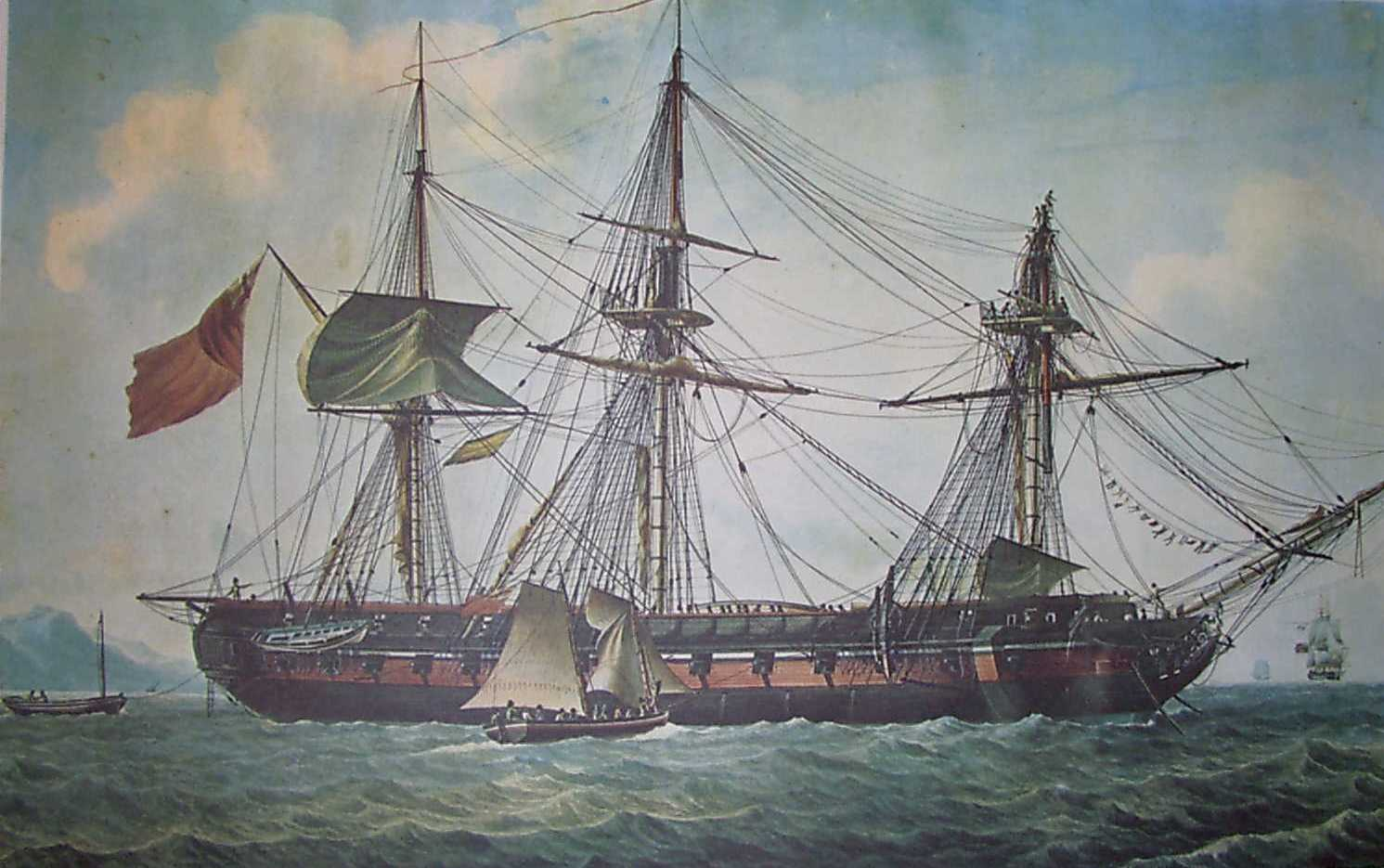
Proserpine represented after her captured (the mizzen was actually more seriously damaged). Watercolour by Antoine Roux.

The incident did not alter the balance of power in the region. Pénélope towed Proserpine to Toulon where the French Navy commissioned her under her existing name. She took part in the Invasion of Algiers in 1830 and remained in service until 1865, when she was hulked and used as a prison.

Otter remained a prisoner in France until the end of the war; he was court martialed for the loss of his ship on 30 May 1814, and honourably acquitted, the court determining that he had defended his ship in the "most gallant and determined manner, and that her colours were not struck until resistance was of no avail".

Dubourdieu was promoted to Officer of the Legion of Honour.

== Notes and references ==
=== Bibliography ===
- Clowes, William Laird, et al. The royal navy: a history from the earliest times to the present, Volume 3
- Hennequin, Joseph François Gabriel (1835). Biographie maritime ou notices historiques sur la vie et les campagnes des marins célèbres français et étrangers (in French). Vol. 3. Paris: Regnault éditeur.
- James, William (2002) [1827]. The Naval History of Great Britain, Volume 3, 1800–1805. London: Conway Maritime Press. ISBN 0-85177-907-7.
- Lecomte, Jules (1836). Chroniques de la marine française: de 1789 à 1830, d'après les documents officiels (in French). Vol. 5. H. Souverain.
- Marshall, John (1824). Royal Naval Biography; Or, Memoirs of the Services of All the Flag-officers, Superannuated Rear-admirals, Retired-captains, Post-captains, and Commanders, Whose Names Appeared on the Admiralty List of Sea Officers at the Commencement of the Present Year, Or who Have Since Been Promoted; Illustrated by a Series of Historical and Explanatory Notes ... With Copious Addenda: Supplement. Vol. 2. London: Longman, Rees, Orme, Brown, and Green.
- Roche, Jean-Michel (2005). Dictionnaire des bâtiments de la flotte de guerre française de Colbert à nos jours. Vol. 1. Group Retozel-Maury Millau. p. 364. ISBN 978-2-9525917-0-6. OCLC 165892922.
- Troude, Onésime-Joachim (1867). Batailles navales de la France (in French). Vol. 3. Challamel ainé.
