= French frigate Proserpine (1809) =

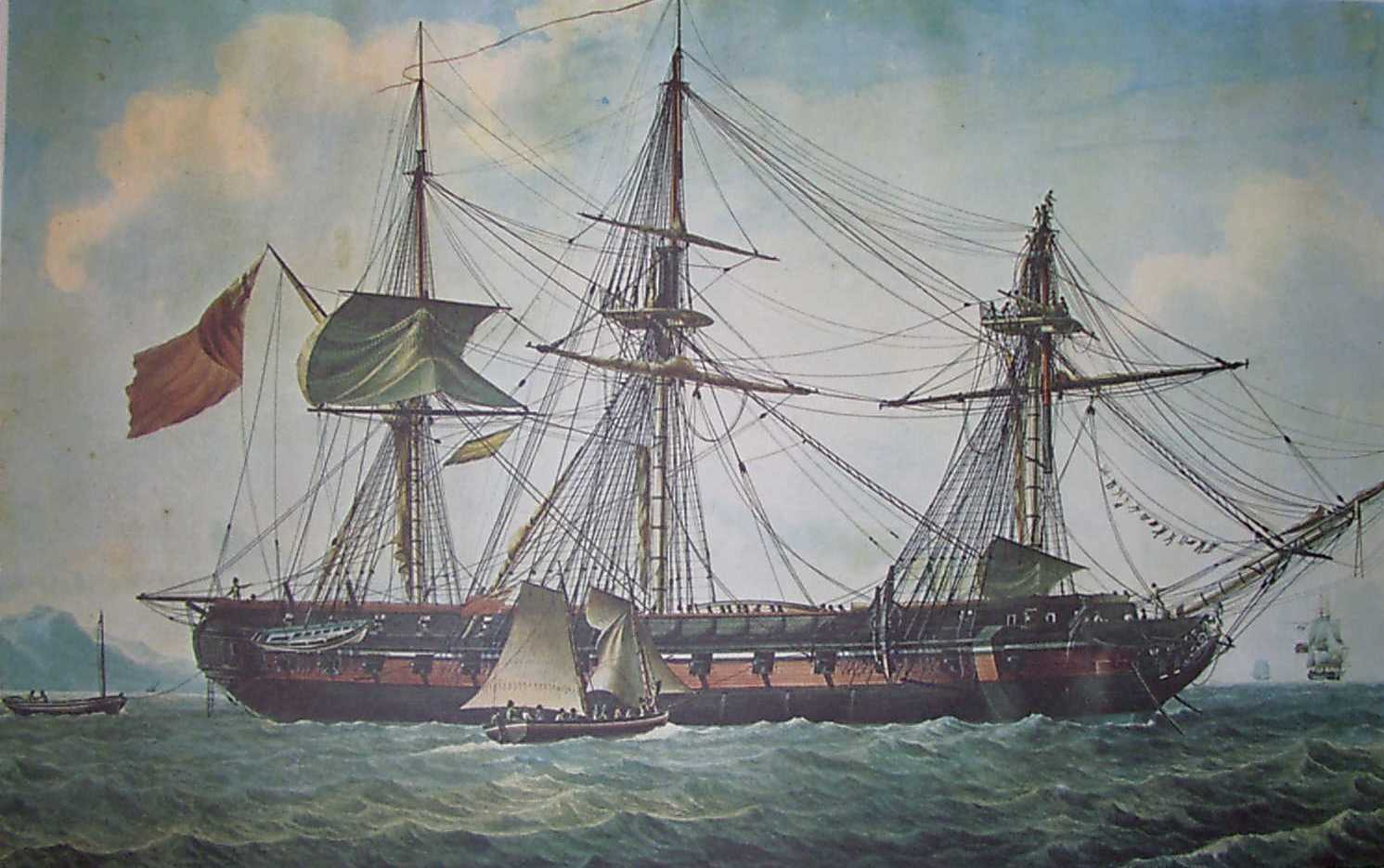
- Portrait of Proserpine by Antoine Roux, after her capture in the action of 27 February 1809

History

United Kingdom
- Name: Proserpine
- Namesake: Proserpina
- Ordered: 4 October 1805
- Builder: Thomas Steemson, Paull (near Hull)
- Laid down: September 1805
- Launched: 27 November 1807
- Captured: In the action of 27 February 1809

France
- Name: Proserpine
- Acquired: By capture
- Commissioned: 1 May 1809
- Fate: Broken up 1865-66

General characteristics
- Class & type: Amphion-class frigate
- Displacement: 800 tons
- Tons burthen: 972 17/94 (bm)
- Propulsion: Sail
- Complement: HMS: 254; French frigate: 319; transport: 110 men
- Armament: HMS; Upper deck: 26 × 18-pounder guns; QD; 4 × 6-pounder guns; 2 × 24-pounder guns (post-1800: 2 × 6-pounder guns + 6 × 24-pounder carronades; Fc: 2 × 6-pounder guns + 2 × 24-pounder carronades; French frigate; 28 × 18-pounder long guns + 12 × 6-pounder guns + 4 × 36-pounder carronades; 1828; Upper deck:26 × 18-pounder guns; Spar deck: 16 × 24-pounder carronades + 2 ×18-pounder guns

HMS Proserpine was a 32-gun Amphion-class frigate built for the Royal Navy during the Napoleonic Wars. The French Navy captured her off Toulon about a year after her commissioning and took her into service as Proserpine. She served in various capacities such as a frigate, troopship, hospital ship, and prison hulk until 1865.

== HMS Proserpine, and capture ==
Captain Charles Otter commissioned Proserpine in September 1807. He then sailed her to the Mediterranean Sea on 6 March 1808.

The British sent Proserpine to sail off Toulon to observe and report on the movements of the French fleet. Captain Bernard Dubourdieu analyzed her patrol pattern, leading the French to send his frigate, Pénélope, accompanied by Pauline, to approach her in the night. They pretended to be the British relief that Otter was expecting and succeeded in engaging her at short range. In the ensuing Action of 27 February 1809, Proserpine had her rigging severely damaged; with no hope of escape or rescue, she struck her colours after a one-hour battle that claimed the life of one of her men, and wounded ten others, one mortally. Pénélope towed Proserpine to Toulon.

== French career ==
At Toulon the French Navy repaired her and took her into French service under her existing name, commissioning her on 1 May 1809. On 1 April, capitaine de frégate Ganteaume, younger brother of Admiral Ganteaume, took command of Proserpine, transferring from Mohawk. Between 28 June and August 1809 she was still under captain Ganteaume's command. She served Admiral Ganteaume's Mediterranean squadron for the remainder of the Napoleonic Wars, with a refit in Genoa in 1810. Between 12 April and 11 October 1811 she was in Genoa roads, and under the command of capitaine de frégate Ganteaume, later capitaine de vaisseau. He was still her captain on 1 February 1812, at Toulon.

At the Bourbon Restoration in 1814, Proserpine was decommissioned and put in the reserve in Toulon. She was recommissioned in 1828, and took part in the Invasion of Algiers in 1830.

In 1840 she was re-classified as an 800-ton displacement corvette de charge.

In 1842, she was transformed into a troopship, and in January 1846 as a transport. She was fitted as a hospital ship in October 1850 at Brest. She served as a hospital ship in the Black Sea during the Crimean War.

The French Navy sent Proserpine to Cayenne, French Guiana, in 1856. There she was converted to a prison hulk in January 1857.

== Fate ==
She was struck from the lists on 20 July 1865, and broken up in 1865-66 in French Guiana.

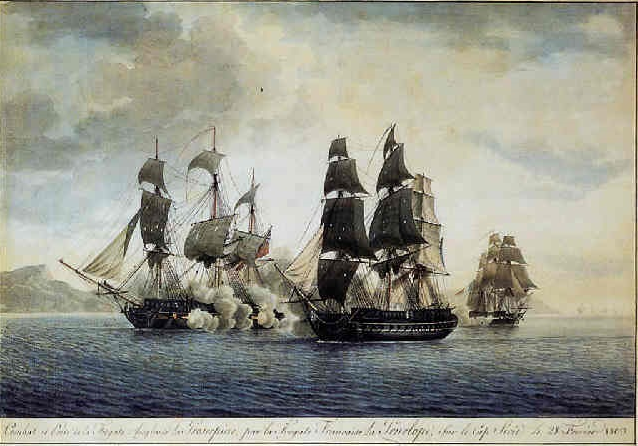
Capture of HMS Proserpine by Pénélope and Pauline. Watercolour by Antoine Roux.
