= List of compositions by Joseph Martin Kraus =

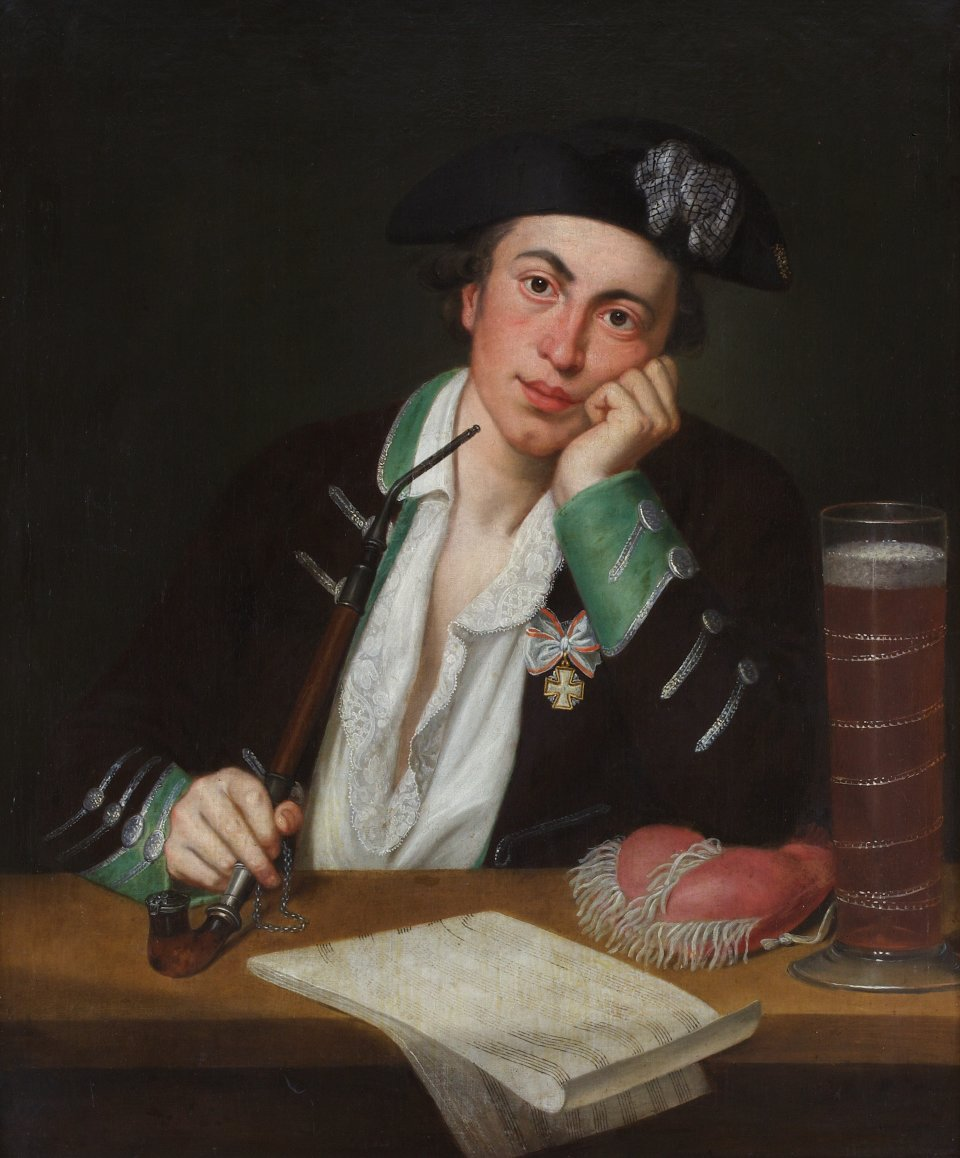
Joseph Martin Kraus (1756-1792) as a student in Erfurt

This list of compositions by Joseph Martin Kraus is organized by number in Bertil H. van Boer's Die Werke von Joseph Martin Kraus: Systematisch-thematisches Werkverzeichnis, which gives each composition a VB number.

The compositions are also arranged in categories: sacred choral works (VB 1–17), secular dramatic works (VB 18–34), ballet music (VB 35–39), secular cantate (VB 40–46), arias and duets (VB 47–66), canons (VB 67–69), lieder (VB 70–120), cantatas and pastorals (VB 121–126), symphonies (VB 127–148), concertos ( VB 149–156), chamber music for more than one instrument (VB 157–184), piano music (VB 185–193), miscellany (VB 194–204).

Bertil van der Boer lists five works mistakenly attributed to Joseph Martin Kraus: a Fugue in D minor by Johann Georg Albrechtsberger, and four pieces by other men named Kraus. A full list of Kraus' works is categorized along with relevant metadata by the Swedish Musical Heritage Society of the Royal Swedish Academy of Music. The total amount of cataloged works total 153 according to the Society, although many works have not yet been included in the inventory yet.

== Symphony ==
- VB 128: Symphony in A major
- VB 129: Sinfonia buffa in F major
- VB 130: Symphony in F major
- VB 131: Symphony (lost)
- VB 132: Symphony "Göttingen" 1 (lost)
- VB 133: Symphony "Göttingen" 2 (lost)
- VB 134: Symphony "Göttingen" 3 (lost)
- VB 135: Symphony "Göttingen" 4 (lost)
- VB 136: Symphony "Göttingen" 5 (lost)
- VB 137: Symphony "Göttingen" 6 (lost)
- VB 138: Symphony in C major "Violino obligato"
- VB 139: Symphony in C major
- VB 140: Symphony in C♯ minor
- VB 141: Symphony in E minor
- VB 142: Symphony in C minor
- VB 143: Symphony in D major
- VB 144: Symphony in E♭ major
- VB 145: Symphony in F major
- VB 148: Symphonie funébre in C minor
- Symphony in D major
- Symphony 'Sigmaringen' 1 in A major (lost)
- Symphony 'Sigmaringen' 2 in G major (lost)
- Symphony 'Sigmaringen' 3 in E♭ major (lost)
- Symphony 'Sigmaringen' 4 in C major (lost)
- Symphony 'Sigmaringen' 5 in D major (lost)

== Duets, Trios, and Quartet ==
- Piano Trio "Hoffstetter" No. 1 (lost)
- Piano Trio "Hoffstetter" No. 2 (lost)
- Piano Trio "Hoffstetter" No. 3 (lost)
- Piano Trio "Hoffstetter" No. 4 (lost)
- Piano Trio "Hoffstetter" No. 5 (lost)
- Piano Trio "Hoffstetter" No. 6 (lost)
- Piano Trio in D major
- Sonata for Piano & Violin in D major
- Sonata for Piano & Violin in C major
- Sonata for Piano & Violin in E♭ major
- Sonata for Piano & Violin in C major
- Allegro for Piano & Violin in D major
- String Quartet in F minor
- String Quartet in C minor
- String Quartet in E major
- String Quartet in B♭ major
- String Quartet in C major
- String Quartet in G minor
- String Quartet in D major
- String Quartet in A major
- String Quartet in C major
- String Quartet in G major

== Concertos ==
- Concerto for 2 Violins (lost)
- Flute Concerto (lost)
- Violin Concerto in C major
- Concerto for Violin & Viola (lost)
- 153a. Concerto for Viola & Cello in G major
- 153b. Viola Concerto in C major
- 153c. Violin Concert in E♭ major

== Vocal ==
- 1778: 'Aandes sagte, vestevinde' ('Aure belle') in F major 1782: Zum Geburtstage des Königs
- 1783: Der Mann im Lehnstuhl
- 1783: 'Ein Schauspiel ist die Welt' G minor (for voice and piano)
- 1785: 'Est on sage, dans le bel âge' A major (for voice and piano)
- 1787: 'Hör mina ömma suckar klaga' (from opera, Visittimman)
- 1788: 'Conservati fedele' in F major
- 1790: Die Henne (for voice and piano)
- An das Klavier (for voice and piano)
- Requiem in D minor
- Requiem for Joseph II (lost)
- Miserere in C minor
- Parvum quando in D major
- Te Deum in D major
- Fracto demum Sacramento in D major
- Proh parvule in C major
- Mot en Alsvåldig Magt in E♭ major
- Stella Coeli in C major
- In te speravi domine in E♭ major
- Miserere (with Roman Hoffstetter) (lost)
- Miserere Nostri Domine in C minor
- Jubileum Mass for Pater Alexander Keck (lost)
- Fragments of a Motet in D major
- Cantata for the Installation of Magnus Lehnberg in D major

== Cantatas and Oratorios ==
- 1778-79: La Pesce
- 1782: Den Frid ett Menlöst Hjerta Njuter
- 1782: Kantate zum Geburtstag Gustav III
- 1790: La Scusa
- 1790: La Primavera
- Die Geburt Jesu (lost)
- Der Tod Jesu

== Opera ==
- 1779: Azire (lost – some orchestral portions remain)
- 1780: La Gelosia
- 1782-1791: Aeneas i Carthago, eller Dido och Aeneas
- 1788: Soliman II, eller De Tre Sultaninnorna
- 1792: Marknaden (lost)
- 1792: Olympie
- 1792: Återfarten ifrån Fiskarstugan
- 1792: Måltiden i Fiskarstugan
- 1792: Fiskarstugan
- Le Bon Seigneur, Schauspiel in 3 Acts (lost)
- Proserpin
- Zoelia, ou L'origine de La Felicité (lost)
- Oedipe (destroyed)
- Carmen Biblicum

== Ballet ==
- 1789: Fiskarena
- Pantomime in D major
- Pantomime in G major

== Piano ==
- 1778: Svensk dans C-dur
- 1787: Keyboard Sonata in E♭ major
- 1783: Keyboard Sonata in E major

== Other ==
1. Musik spiel (unarchieved, lost)
2. 4 Intermezzos To Molière's Amphitryon
3. Couplets to Fintbergs Bröllop
4. Couplets to Fri-Corpsen, eller Dalkarkarne (lost)
5. Du, i Hvars Oskuldsfulla in G major
6. Couplets Till Födelsedagen (lost)
7. Äfventyraren, eller Resan till Månans Ö
8. Möt Sveafolk din Tacksamhet in C major
9. Choruses to Oedipe
10. Ballet Movements for Gluck's Armide
11. Non piu fra sassi algosi in E major
12. In te spero, o sposa amata in B♭ major
13. T'intendo, si mio cor in E♭ major
14. Duet in G major (lost)
15. Aria in A♭ major (lost)
16. Misero pargoletto in F minor
17. Sentimi, non partir...Al mio bene in E♭ major
18. Innocente donzelletta in B♭ major
19. Du temps qui detruit tout in G major
20. Ch'io mai vi possa in C major
21. Del destin non vi lagnate in A major
22. Ch'io parta? M'accheto in F major
23. Se non ti moro al lato in E♭ major
24. Ma, tu tremi in E♭ major
25. Non temer, non son piu amante in B♭ major
26. Fermati!...Se tutti i mali miei in E♭ major
27. Son pietosa e sono amante in F major
28. Fra l'ombre un lampo solo in F major
29. Meine Mutter hat gense in F major
30. Chorus and Canon
31. Aandes saagte, Vestenvinde in F major
32. Schweizerrundgesang in F major
33. Rheinweinlied in G major
34. An - Als ihm die - Starb in E♭ major
35. An die quelle in E♭ major
36. Hans und Hanne in C major
37. An den Wind in B♭ major
38. An den Wind in F major
39. Ich bin ein deutscher Jüngling in C major
40. Ich bin vergnügt in C major
41. Daphné am Bach in G major
42. Phidile in C major
43. Das Rosenband in A major
44. Anselmuccio in A major
45. An mein mädchen in B♭ major
46. Das schwarze Lischen aus Kastillien in G major
47. Der nordische witwer in A major
48. Ein Lied um Regen in D major
49. Die mutter bei der Wiege in B♭ major
50. Ein Wiegenlied in E minor
51. Der Abschied in F minor
52. Ein Wiegenlied in G major
53. Gesundheit in F major
54. Depuis longtemps in G major
55. Dors mon enfant in E♭ major
56. Point de Tristesse in A major
57. Sans Venus in F major
58. Aande lente in G major
59. Conservati fedele in F major
60. Notturno in G major
61. Si mio ben in E♭ major
62. L'istessa Canzonetta alla Calabrese in C major
63. Ti sento sospiri in G major
64. Bröder! se Bålen in G major
65. Charon på en Doktor såg (lost)
66. Elegie in F major
67. Hvart hastar Du? in C major
68. Stancer till Elias Martin in G major
69. Mine Herrar in A major
70. Öfver Mozarts Död in E♭ major
71. Posten riktigt öppnad blef in F major
72. Se Källan, Se Lunden in D major
73. Ynglingarne in D minor
74. Atis Och Camilla in G major
75. Den 9 Januarii 1793 (lost)
76. Gracernas Besök vid Professoren Herr Tobias Sergel (lost)
77. Cantate Till en värdig Vän (lost)
78. Den 24 Januarii 1792
79. Sinfonia Buffa in F major
80. Sinfonia Da Chiesa in D major
81. Sinfonia Da Chiesa in D minor
82. Sinfonia per la Chiesa; Riksdagsmarsch in D major
83. Contradances (lost)
84. Duo for Violin & Viola (lost)
85. Sonata for Harpsichord & Violin in D minor
86. Duo for Flute & Viola in D major
87. String Trio (lost)
88. Kleine Quadros
89. Flute Quintet Opus 7 in D major
90. Keyboard Sonata for Countess Ingelheim (lost)
91. Zwei neue curiose Minuetten fürs Klavier
92. Rondo for Keyboard in F major
93. Variations for Keyboard in C major
94. Larghetto for Keyboard in G major
95. 11 Chorale Preludes for Organ
96. Mass in E minor
97. Förkunnom högt Hans Lof och Magt in C major
98. Du, Vår Välgörare och Far in B♭ major
99. Dröj, Sol, uti din uppgångstimma in D major
100. Stücke 1
101. Stücke 2
102. Stücke 3
103. Stücke 4
104. Stücke 5
105. Stücke 6
106. Exercises for Soprano

== Addenda (Anhang) ==
- Mass in E minor
- Entr'acte to Äfventyraren in A major
- Poeter Prisa Många Gånger in A major
- Lydia och Arist in E♭ major
- Polonaise for Orchestra in D major
- Trumpet Concerto (lost)
- Variations for Trumpet and Orchestra (lost)
- Trio for Keyboard, Flute & Cello in C major
- Rondo Capriccio for Keyboard in G major
