= Seitenbacher =

German food company

Seitenbacher GmbH Naturkost
- Company type: Gesellschaft mit beschränkter Haftung (GmbH)
- Industry: Food
- Founded: 1980
- Founder: Willi Pfannenschwarz
- Headquarters: Buchen, Baden-Württemberg, Germany
- Products: See Products
- Number of employees: 140 (2016)
- Website: www.seitenbacher.de (in German)

Seitenbacher GmbH Naturkost is a German food company based in Buchen, Baden-Württemberg. It is especially famous for its uncommon commercials.

== History ==
Seitenbacher GmbH Naturkost was founded in 1980 by German learned miller Willi Pfannenschwarz in Waldenbuch and is named after the Seitenbach stream which lies there. In 1990, the company was among the five largest cereal manufacturers in Germany. The Grünsfelder Ölmühle, which is in bankruptcy, was taken over in 2010 and the range was expanded to include edible oils.

Today, the company claims to have around 140 employees. The annual turnover in 2017 was 27 million euros.

== Products ==
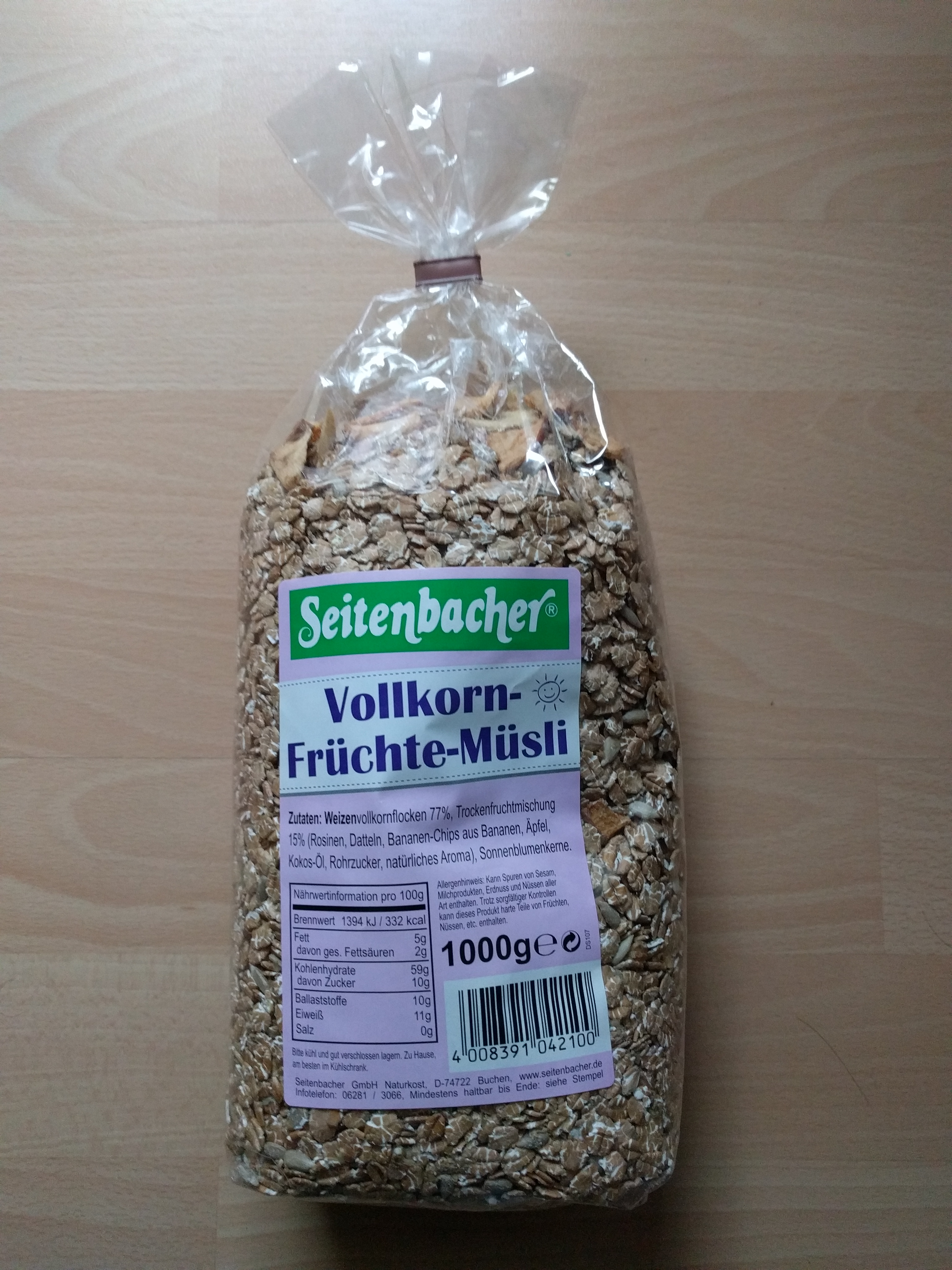
Cereal packaging by Seitenbacher

Seitenbacher offers various foods, including organic products. Cereal varieties make up the largest part of the range; it also offers pasta, sourdough, baking mixes, grain burgers, fruit gums, bars, seeds, snacks, chocolate cereals, honey, coffee, biscuits, soups, vitamin capsules and edible oils.

== Radio commercials ==
The company gained notoriety primarily through its unusual, amateur radio commercials. These are usually spoken personally by the company's boss Willi Pfannenschwarz and recorded in his own recording studio in his basement. They are popular because of their distinctive dialect, their loose presentation style and their simple advertising slogans (for example: "Seitenbacher-Müsli – lecker, lecker, lecker!" ('Seitenbacher cereals - yummy, yummy, yummy!') spoken by his then ten-year-old daughter in 1996 or the "Seitenbacher-Müsli, woisch, des isch des Müsli von dem Seitebacher!" ('Seitenbacher cereals, you know, these are the cereals from the Seitenbacher!'). The spots are regularly broadcast across Germany. According to a study by the Südwestrundfunk (SWR) magazine Marktcheck, the company's commercials are polarizing.
