= Symphonie funèbre =

1792 funeral music by Joseph Martin Kraus

The SORG MUSIK vid Högst Salig Hans Kongl. Maÿ^{sts} KONUNG GUSTAF III^{s} Bisättning by Joseph Martin Kraus was composed in 1792 as music for the funeral ceremonies (laying out) of the Swedish King Gustav III. The four-movement work was performed on 13 April 1792 in Riddarholmen church, the traditional burial church in Stockholm of Swedish monarchs. Since 1804 at the latest, it has been known under the name Symphonie funèbre (in Bertil van Boer's catalogue of works under number VB 148).

All four movements are in slow tempo. An introductory, solemnly carried Andante mesto with muted timpani and trumpets is followed by a rhythmically profiled Larghetto, like a shriek dance, with melodically ariose qualities. The third movement is simply titled Choral and consists of a simple four-part setting over the first verse of the Protestant hymn Now let us bury the body by Michael Weiße (1531). The finale begins in Adagio, in which the chorale is processed as a cantus firmus movement as well as a fugue (with a rhythmically altered thematic head). The cycle ends with a return of the timpani induction from the Andante mesto. The instrumentation, with two oboes each, clarinets and bassoons, four horns, two trumpets, timpani and strings, mainly serves the low registers.

Genetically and musically there is a close relationship to the funeral cantata (VB 42) performed on 14 May 1792, which is modelled both in text (Carl Gustav Leopold) and formally on conventions of the Passion Oratorio. This two-part funeral music for Gustav III - consisting of symphony and cantata - forms the musical climax and end of the short but culturally brilliant "Gustavian age".
