= Johann Franz Bessel =

German Benedictine abbot and historian

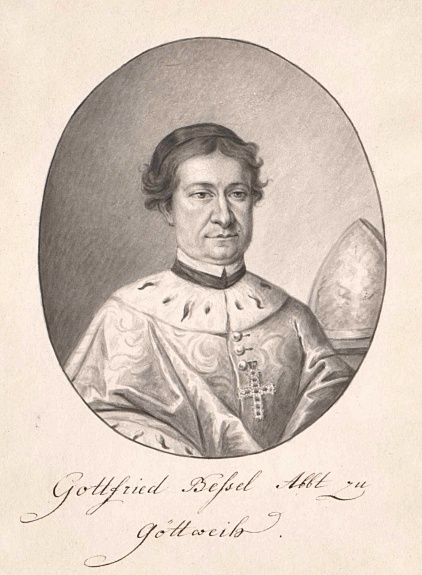
Gottfried Bessel

Johann Franz Bessel (in religion Gottfried; 5 September 1672, at Buchen, in the Grand Duchy of Baden – 22 January 1749 at Göttweig) was a German Benedictine abbot and historian.

== Life ==
He made his course in the humanities at Aschaffenburg, Würzburg, and Bamberg, and in 1690 entered the University of Salzburg, conducted by the Benedictines, where he specialized in philosophy, also attending lectures on theology and jurisprudence. He entered the Benedictine Order at Göttweig on the Danube, Lower Austria, 15 June 1692. After making his vows (21 June 1693), he completed his theological course at Vienna, was ordained (21 March 1696), and on 23 May was granted the degree of Doctor of Theology, being shortly afterwards appointed Lector in philosophy and theology in the monastery of Seligenstadt on the River Main.

In 1699 he was summoned to the electoral court of Mainz by Archbishop Lothar Franz von Schönborn, who immediately sent him to Rome to study the curial practice of the Rota Romana. Having completed a two years' course in law, he obtained the degree of Doctor Juris Utriusque, and on his return to Mainz (1703) he was appointed vicar general and supreme judge of the ecclesiastical court of the archdiocese of Mainz. He was also employed on various diplomatic missions, as, for instance, to the court of Brunswick-Wolfenbüttel in connection with the conversion of Duke Anton Ulrich and his granddaughter, the Princess Elisabeth Christine, later the wife of Emperor Charles VI.

He made three journeys to Rome to settle differences between the pope and the emperor concerning the limits of the province of Commacchio. On 7 February 1714, he was elected Abbot of Göttweig, and from that time forward was commissioned by the emperor to conduct diplomatic negotiations, in addition to being made imperial theologian and serving twice as honorary rector of the University of Vienna.

Abbot Bessel was the second founder of Göttweig, which became, under his rule of thirty-five years, a centre of learning. He added to the rare Hebrew, Greek, and Roman coins and bracteates collections of copper-plate engravings (over 20,000), minerals, shells, and paintings. By the expenditure of princely sums he enriched the library with thousands of volumes, chiefly on historical subjects, as well as incunabula and MSS. Himself a thorough scholar, he encouraged among his religious all undertakings of a scientific or artistic nature. When the abbey was almost totally destroyed by fire, he gathered, by judicious management, means sufficient to rebuild it on a more splendid scale.

Abbot Bessel was a retiring religious man.

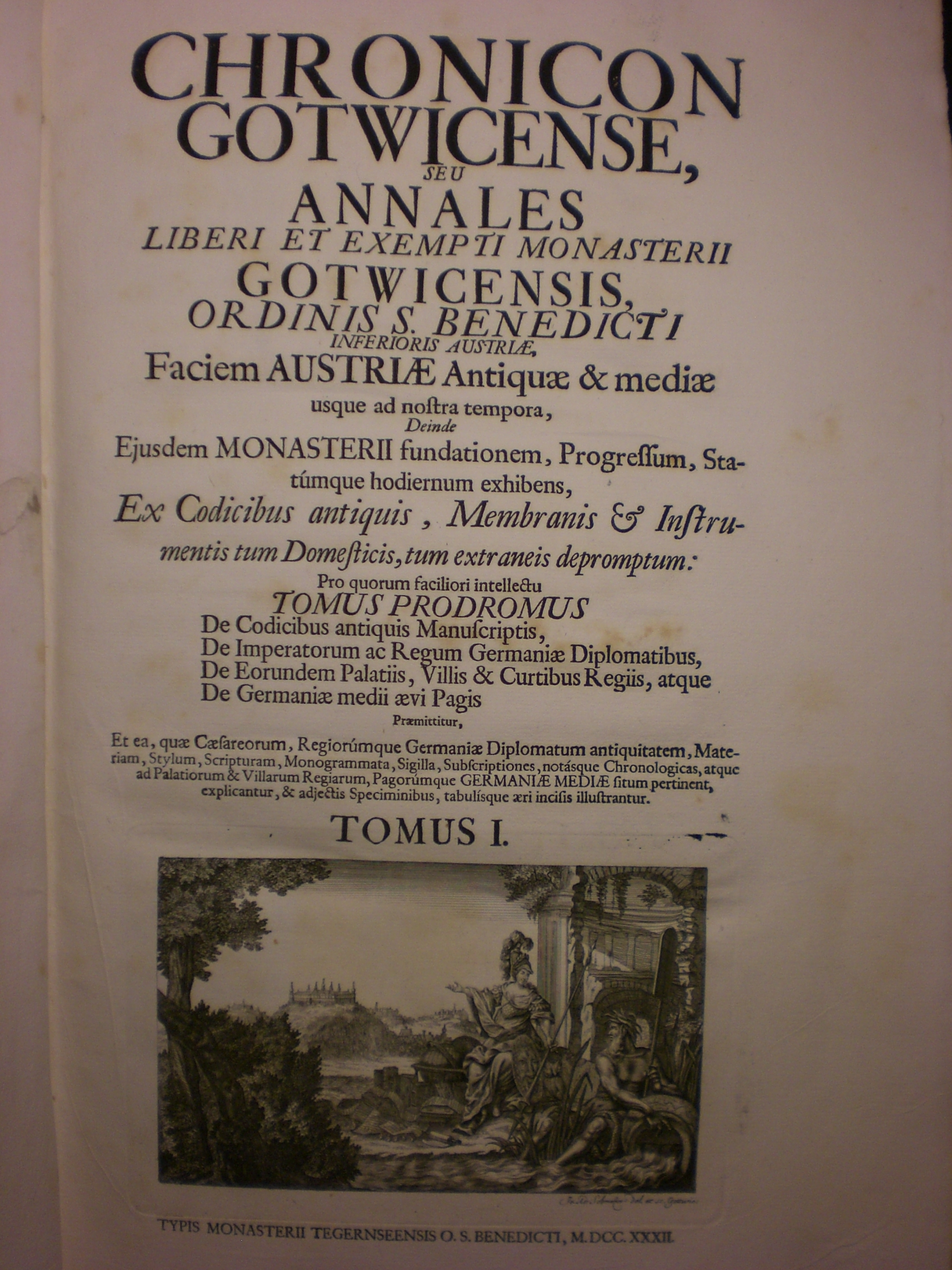
Chronicon Gotwicense (1732), title page

== Works ==
Besides several comparatively unimportant works, such as "Mararita pretiosa", "Curiae Romanae praxis", and "Austriae ritus", he published (Vienna, 1732) two letters of Augustine of Hippo to Optatus, Bishop of Mileve, which had been until then unknown. He is erroneously credited with the authorship of "Quinquaginta Romano-catholicam fidem omnibus aliis praeferendi motiva" (Mainz, 1708), a controversial work written originally in Latin, but translated into almost every European tongue.

The work which brought him lasting renown and a place in the records of the science of history is entitled Chronicon Gottwicense, tomus prodromus (Tegernsee, 1732). Not, as might be thought, a history of the abbey, this single volume is a comprehensive work on German diplomatics, treating of manuscripts found in registers and archives, original documentary evidence, diplomas of German emperors and kings, and inscriptions and seals, illustrated with maps and engravings on copper. The author also discusses medieval geography, as well as the royal palace-domains (Pfalzen) and the various districts of Germany. Great learning and clear critical acumen distinguish this work, which marked an epoch in the history of German diplomatics, and has served as the basis of all later works on the same subject.
