= Wilhelm Emelé =

German painter

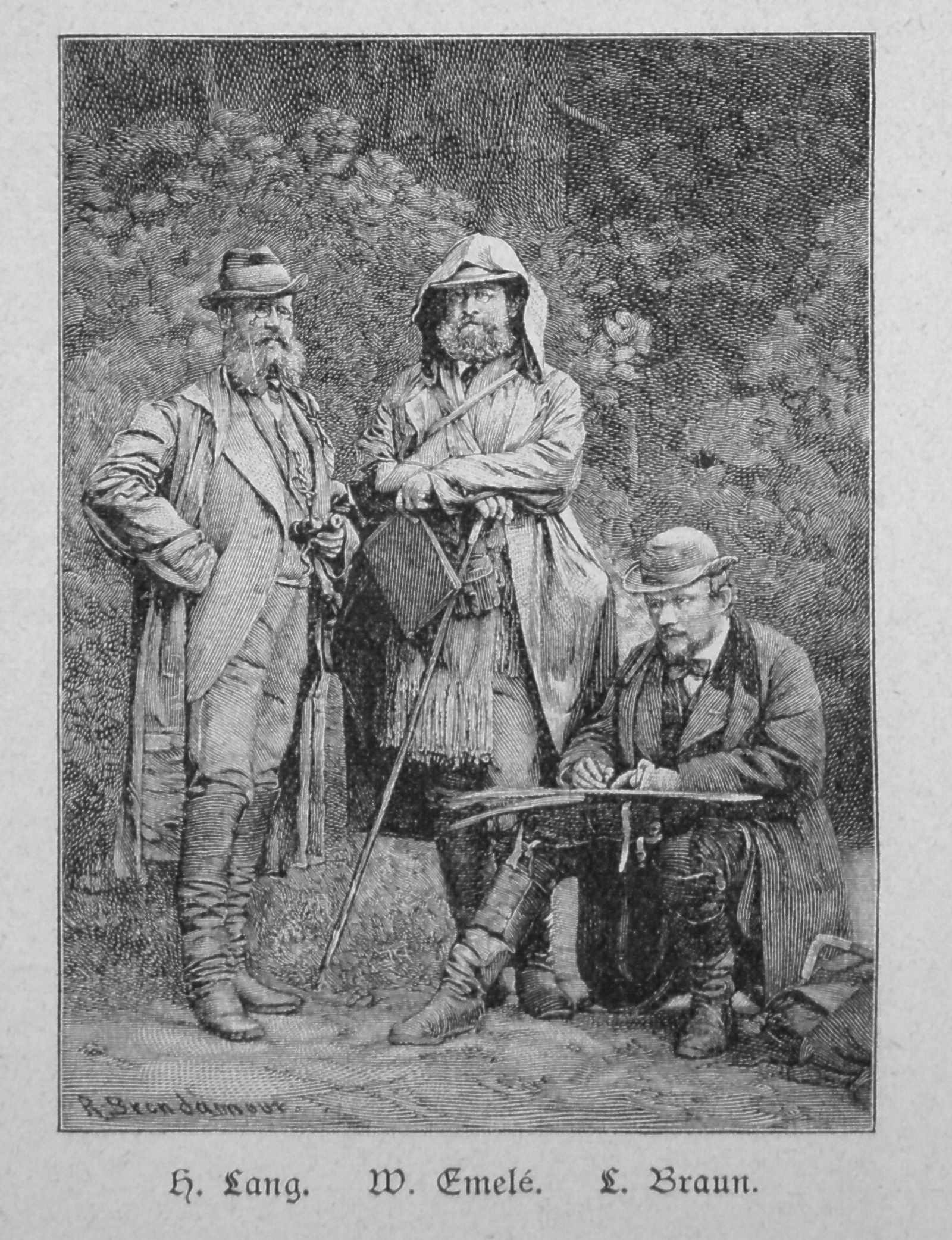
Wilhelm Emelé with fellow battle painters Heinrich Lang (1838-1891) and Ludwig Braun (1836-1916)

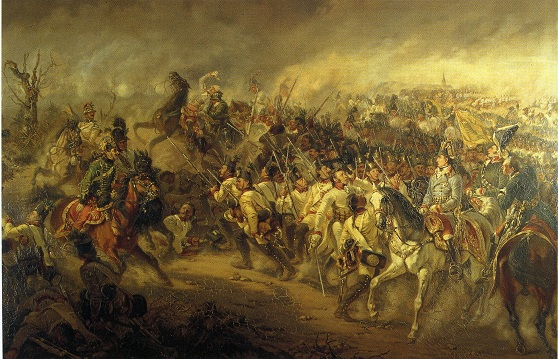
The Battle of Liptingen

Wilhelm Emelé (30 May 1830 – 11 October 1905) was a German painter of horses, military scenes and hunting scenes.

== Biography ==
He was born in Buchen, Odenwald. He first adopted a military career but studied art with Feodor Dietz at Munich and later at Antwerp and Paris. His canvases are noted for exact knowledge of military detail and are spirited in conception, his subjects being military. He lived in Vienna after 1861 where he attained great popularity as a painter of equestrian portraits and hunting scenes. Afterwards he resided successively in Munich, Berlin, and Karlsruhe. He died in Freiburg im Breisgau.

== Works ==
- “Battle of Stockach”
- “Capture of Heidelberg Bridge in 1799” (1857), purchased by the Austrian emperor
- “The Fight Near Aldenhoven” (1859)
- “The Square of the Battle of Aspern” (1860)
- “Capture of Camp Near Farmars”
- “Attack on the English by French Cuirassiers at Waterloo”
- “Battle of Würzburg” (1867), his best work for some
- “The Archduke Charles at Battle of Neerwinden” (1872)
- “Attack of the Bournernain Division Near Elsasshausen”
- “Battle of Dijon”
- “Meeting of Patrols of Seventh and Fourteenth Corps, Prussian Army, Near Vesoul”
- “Headquarters of 14th Army Corps in Battle of Belfast”
- “Episode of Battle of Wörth”
- “Victory of George II over the French at Dettingen” (1879)
- “Cavalry Encounter near Langenbrück”, gained first medal at the Vienna Exposition in 1873

== See also ==
- List of German painters
