= Riksdagsmarschen =

Suite of music composed by Joseph Martin Kraus

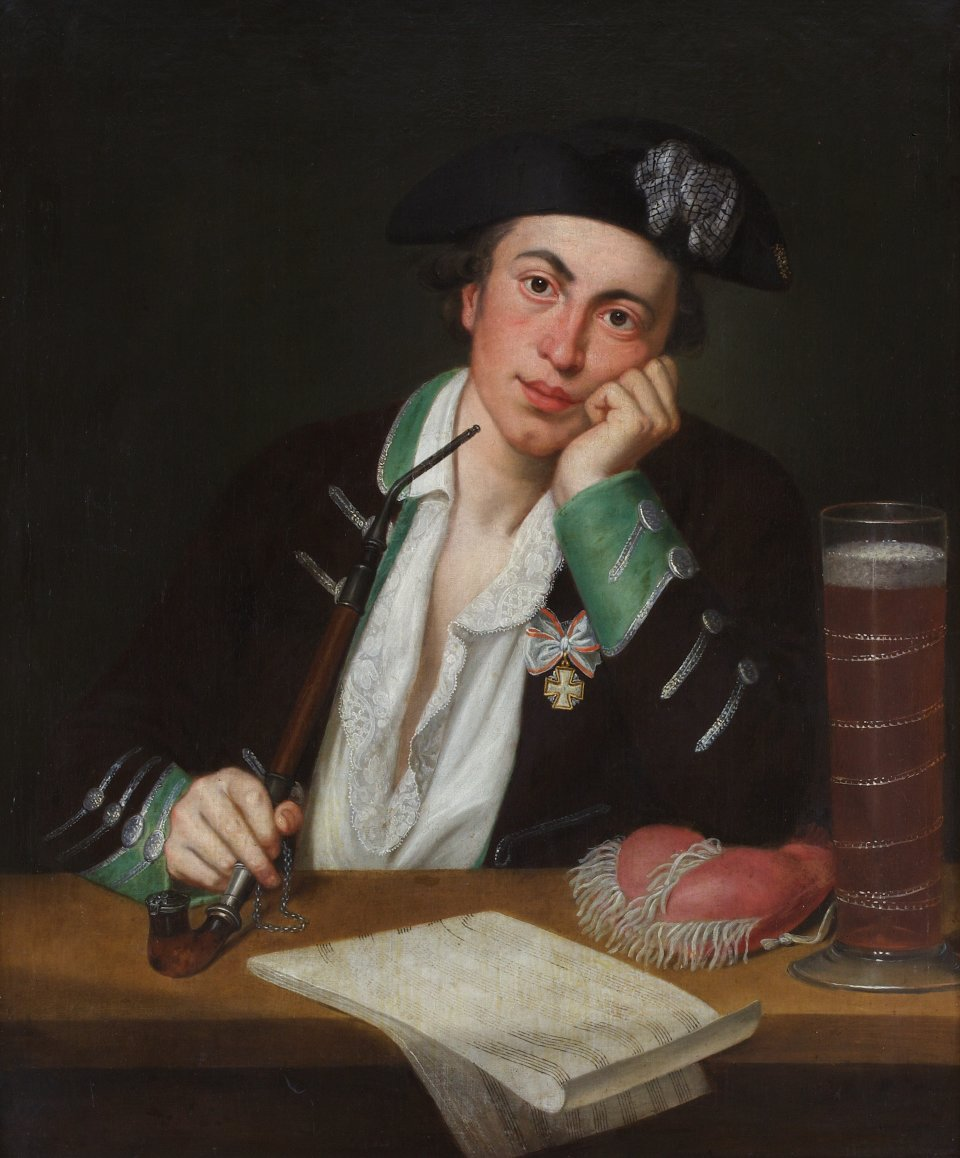
Joseph Martin Kraus

Riksdagsmarschen, or the Riksdag Marsch, is a suite of music composed by Joseph Martin Kraus, for the grand opening, in 1789, of the Riksdag of the Estates in Sweden. King Gustav III of Sweden wanted to convince the parliament to go along, especially fund, his ongoing war. He was opposed by the nobility but supported by the burgesses and yeomanry, and the king had Kraus write the suite for this occasion, consisting of a march based on the March of the Priests from Mozart's Idomeneo, and a symphony. The legislature financed the king's measures which became known as Gustav III's Russian War.

== See also ==
- Riksdag
- Drottningholmsmusiken
- Music of Sweden
