= Joseph Martin Kraus =

German–Swedish composer

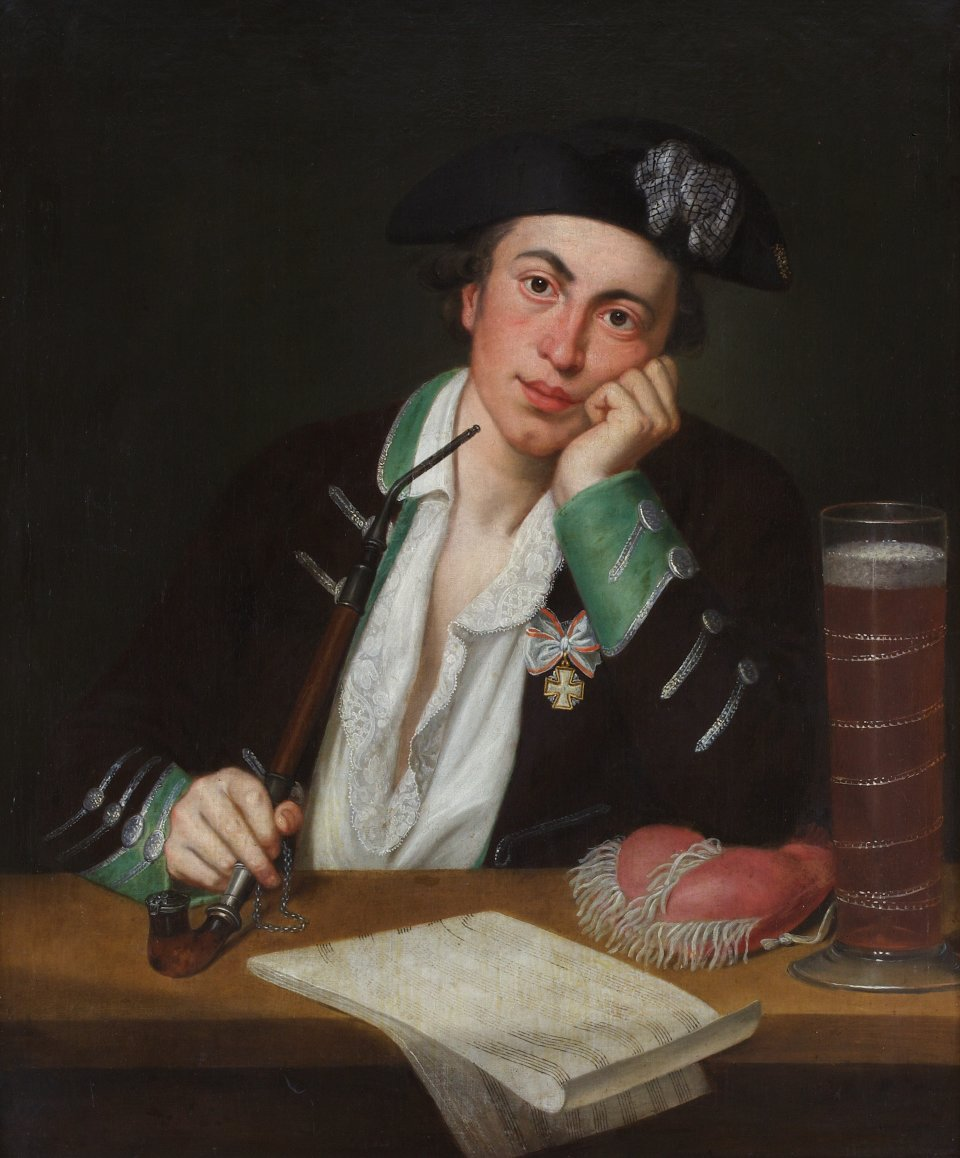
Joseph Martin Kraus (1756–1792) as a student in Erfurt.

Joseph Martin Kraus (20 June 1756 – 15 December 1792), was a German-Swedish composer in the Classical era who was born in Miltenberg am Main, Holy Roman Empire. He moved to Sweden at age 21, and died at the age of 36 in Stockholm. He has been referred to as "the Swedish Mozart", although his music is rarely performed today. He is best known for having been a sacred music composer, while his symphonic output was much higher than is extant today. He composed in a wide array of forms, and took his greatest aesthetic influence from Haydn and Mozart. His competency and artistic skills were praised almost universally during his time.

== Life ==
=== Childhood ===
Kraus was born in the South German town of Miltenberg in Lower Franconia, the son of Joseph Bernhard Kraus, a county clerk in the Archbishopric of Mainz, and Anna Dorothea née Schmidt. His father's family, originally from Augsburg, had a small restaurant in Weilbach near Amorbach, while his mother was a daughter of the master-builder at Miltenberg Johann Martin Schmidt. They had 14 children, of whom seven died in childhood; Marianne Kraus was a sister of Joseph's.

After a short stay in Osterburken, the Kraus family moved in 1761 to Buchen (in the Odenwald), where Joseph Bernhard Kraus found a position as a clerk. Joseph Martin Kraus began his formal education there. His first music teachers were rector Georg Pfister (1730–1807) and cantor Bernhard Franz Wendler (1702–1782), who gave him mainly piano and violin lessons. Kraus showed his musical talent at an early age. When he was 12, he was enrolled in the Jesuit Gymnasium and Music Seminar at Mannheim, where he studied German and Latin literature and music. There he received a rigorous musical training, especially in violin technique, and philological education from P. Alexander Keck (1724–1804) and P. Anton Klein (1748–1810).

=== Studies ===
Kraus's parents wished him to matriculate as a student of law at the University of Mainz in 1773. However, he was not satisfied with the situation at that university, and even published a satire about it. After only one year, he applied to the University of Erfurt, where he could study music too. Both Catholic and Protestant (Lutheran) music were flourishing in Erfurt, with a rich musical tradition. Kraus soon neglected his law studies and focused fully on music and literature.

A defamation trial against his father forced him to interrupt his studies for one year and move back to Buchen. He spent his time there writing his three-act tragedy Tolon and several musical works for the town church of St. Oswald, including a Te Deum in D major and the motet Fracto Demum Sacramento, also in D major. After this one-year break, he continued his studies of law in Göttingen. Although the Göttinger Hainbund (the German poet group that flourished in 1772–74) no longer existed, Kraus found himself very much attracted to the ideas of this group of young poets who were almost fanatically devoted to Friedrich Gottlieb Klopstock. In this period Kraus composed a recently rediscovered book of 19 poems titled Versuch von Schäfersgedichten. He became increasingly involved with the Sturm und Drang movement, which influenced both his writing and his music.

In 1775, at the age of nineteen, Kraus wrote his Requiem, one of his earliest compositions. There is no way to know for sure whether young Kraus was induced to compose this genre of church music for personal reasons, or whether his choice may have been influenced by his attraction to Sturm und Drang. The work is full of dramatic force and original, bold ideas.

The Requiem was followed by two oratorios: Der Tod Jesu and Die Geburt Jesu (lost), and the musical treatise Etwas von und über Musik: fürs Jahr 1777 (Something about Music: for the year 1777; Frankfurt am Main 1778).

The oratorio Der Tod Jesu differs from the oratorios of many other composers in that Kraus wrote both the music and the text. As a librettist, Kraus showed a series of scenes that covered the full spectrum of human emotions, from sorrow and fear to joy. The work corresponds fully to a rhetorical question already raised in Kraus's treatise Etwas von und über Musik:

"Should not church music be mostly for the heart?"
("Soll die Musik in den Kirchen nicht am meisten fürs Herz sein?")

During his stay in Göttingen, Kraus had become friendly with a Swedish fellow student, Carl Stridsberg, who persuaded him to accompany him to Stockholm to apply for a position at the court of King Gustav III.

=== At the Swedish court ===
Kraus moved to Stockholm in 1778, when he was not yet twenty-two. His first years there were not easy, and more than once he considered going back home. King Gustav's love for the fine arts had quickly become known in the rest of Europe and attracted musicians from many countries. It took Kraus three bitter years, often spent in extreme poverty, before the king noticed him. His opera Azire was rejected by the Royal Swedish Academy of Music, but the Academy decided to give him a second chance. Gustav III himself drafted the opera libretto Proserpin, which the poet Johan Henric Kellgren versified. Kraus's music to this libretto was successfully premiered at Ulriksdal Palace on 6 June 1781, before the king and the royal household. Kraus was appointed vice-Kapellmeister of the Royal Swedish Opera and director of the Royal Academy of Music.

It was the long-awaited breakthrough. Dizzy with the success, Kraus wrote to his parents:

"Immediately after the music ended, the king talked to me for more than a quarter of an hour ... it had simply given him so much satisfaction. Yesterday I was engaged by him. Of course I was not granted any great title, but quite simply that of Kapellmeister. What is worth much more to me than 600 guilders is the favour I have been granted, which is that I am to undertake a journey to Germany, France and Italy at the King's expense."

=== Grand Tour ===
Gustav III sent Kraus on a Grand Tour of Europe that lasted five years, to learn all he could about Theater abroad. On this trip, Kraus met Christoph Willibald Gluck, Johann Georg Albrechtsberger, Padre Martini, and Joseph Haydn, for whom he wrote a symphony to play at Esterháza; it was first published under Haydn's name in Paris. Kraus's Symphonies in E minor, VB 141, and F major, VB 145, were first published in Paris in 1787, under the name of Giuseppe Cambini, a very popular composer at the time. During this time, Kraus became a member of the same masonic lodge as Wolfgang Amadeus Mozart whom he met and became very friendly with.

During his journey, Kraus also wrote his famous flute quintet in D Major, VB 188, that broke with all the erstwhile conventions that governed such pieces. The outer and inner form of that work were groundbreaking comparing with everything previously composed at the time, with the astoundingly long first movement of 306 bars.

After Vienna, his journey also took him throughout Italy, France, and England, where he witnessed the Handel Centenary celebrations at Westminster Abbey in 1785. While in Paris, he experienced difficulty with cabals back in Stockholm that sought to prevent his return, but their resolution in 1786 made it possible for him to become the leading figure in Gustavian musical life.

=== Back to Sweden ===
When Kraus returned in 1787, he was appointed as director of curriculum at the Royal Swedish Academy of Music, and the next year he succeeded Francesco Uttini as Kapellmästare, eventually attaining a reputation as an innovative conductor, progressive pedagogue, and multi-talented composer. He also became a member of the literary circle that gathered round the Architect Erik Palmstedt (who was commissioned by King Gustav III to build the first royal opera house), a group that discussed intellectual and cultural life in the Swedish capital.

For the convening of the Riksdag of the Estates in 1789, Gustav III wanted to persuade the parliament to accede to his ongoing war with Russia, where he was opposed by the nobility but supported by the burghers and the peasantry. To further his aims, Gustav III intended to secure parliamentary approval of the Act of Union and Security that would give him broad powers over the administration of the government. The king asked Kraus to write Riksdagsmusiken for the opening ceremonies in St Nicolai Church on 9 March 1789. The music consists of a march, based on the March of the returning warriors (No. 8) in the Intermezzo from Mozart's Idomeneo, and a symphony (Sinfonia per la chiesa). The legislature approved the king's measures.

Kraus wrote an overture, a march and interludes for the staging of Voltaire's Olympie in January 1792. Although he was considered as a composer of stage music, his greatest work, Aeneas i Cartago, remained unperformed during his lifetime. 16 March 1792, Gustav III attended a masked ball at the opera, where he was assassinated. (This inspired the plots of operas by several composers, notably Verdi's Un ballo in maschera premiered in 1859.) The death of Gustav III caused considerable turmoil in the cultural establishment that the monarch had nurtured. Kraus wrote a funeral cantata and the Symphonie funèbre, which were played at the burial ceremony on April 13 and May 14.

Kraus's own health deteriorated shortly thereafter, and he died in December 1792 from tuberculosis. He was buried outside Stockholm at Tivoli following a ceremony where his coffin was carried across the ice of the Brunnsviken by torchlight. His tomb (c. 1833) bears the inscription: Här det jordiska af Kraus, det himmelska lefver i hans toner, which translates to: Here the earthly of Kraus; the heavenly lives in his music

== Musical output ==
For his complete works: List of compositions by Joseph Martin Kraus

=== Works ===
Bertil H. van Boer divides Kraus's sacred music into two periods. The first, from 1768 to 1777, comprises Kraus's music written as a Roman Catholic for Catholic services. For the second, from 1778 to 1790, Kraus was still Catholic, but wrote music for Lutheran services. Aside from short hymns and chorales, there was not much use for sacred music in Sweden at that time. There was also an ongoing debate regarding the role music should play in the church, and Kraus participated by writing three articles on the subject in the Stockholms-Posten.

Two different catalogues exist of Kraus's music, one by Karl Schreiber, Verzeichnis der Musikalischen Werke von Jos. Kraus's, which gives each composition an A number, and one by Bertil van Boer's Die Werke von Joseph Martin Kraus: Systematisch-thematisches Werkverzeichnis, which gives each composition a VB number, with renumberings in the 2nd edition (1998). See the list of compositions by Joseph Martin Kraus.

Bertil van Boer edited modern editions for Artaria Editions, recorded on four volumes of the Naxos Records complete set of Kraus symphonies, and also wrote the programme notes for those discs as well as the article on Kraus in the New Grove Dictionary of Music and Musicians. Volume 1 won the Cannes Classical Award in 1999, while Volume 2 contains world première recordings of three of Kraus's symphonies. The orchestra Concerto Köln won several prizes for its recordings on period instruments of the complete symphonies of Joseph Martin Kraus.

=== Musical style ===
Kraus's music is characterized by sudden dramatic contrasts in register, character, and most striking of all, harmony. His contrapuntal abilities were first-rate, but his motivic development does not seem as advanced as either Mozart's or Haydn's. Compared to other contemporaries, his lyrical gifts are apparent.

=== Kraus's symphonies ===
Many of Kraus's symphonies have been lost, or attributed to other composers. Of those definitely of Kraus's authorship, only about a dozen remain. Most of Kraus's extant symphonies are in three movements, without a minuet. Most are scored for two horns and strings, many include two flutes and two oboes, while the later ones also include two bassoons and two additional horns. The musicologist Bertil van Boer identifies Kraus's Symphony in C-sharp minor as "one of only two symphonies in this key written during the eighteenth century." It was later reworked in a more 'manageable' key as Symphony in C minor, VB 142.

It is still disputed whether the symphony dedicated to Haydn was the Symphony in D major VB 143 or the Symphony in C minor VB 142. The minor key and the mood of Symphony VB 142 seem to be reminiscent of Haydn's Sturm und Drang period around 1770, comparable with his earlier minor-key works, although based on the first measures of Gluck's overture to Iphigénie en Aulide. In any case, Haydn had a very high opinion of the work. Many years after Kraus's death, Haydn remarked to a common friend, Swedish diplomat Fredrik Samuel Silverstolpe:

"The symphony he wrote here in Vienna especially for me will be regarded as a masterpiece for centuries to come; believe me, there are few people who can compose something like that."

=== Kraus viola concerti ===
Kraus wrote two viola concerti that were lost or attributed to other composers in his lifetime. The C major Concerto was attributed to Roman Hoffstetter, but both works have been found to be Kraus's compositions and have been recorded professionally by David Aaron Carpenter in 2012.

=== Chamber music ===
Kraus's chamber music includes quartets, solo sonatas, and sonatas for violin and piano.

== See also ==
- Johan Helmich Roman
- Music of Sweden
- List of Swedes in music
- Anno 1790 (Swedish 2011 television series set in Stockholm in 1790–92)
