= Marianne Kraus =

German painter

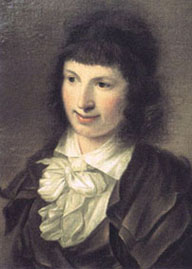
- Marianne Kraus (oil paint on canvas, painter unknown)
- Born: Maria Anna Walburga Lämmerhirt; May 8, 1765; Buchen, Germany
- Died: May 24, 1838 (aged 73); Erbach im Odenwald, Germany
- Known for: Paintings; Writings

Maria Anna Walburga Lämmerhirt (nickname, "Marianne"; 8 May 1765 – 24 May 1838) was a German painter, drafter, travel writer, and lady-in-waiting. Through her diary, Für mich gemerkt auf meiner Reise nach Italien 1791, she contributed to travel literature.

== Early years and education ==
Maria Kraus was born in Buchen (Odenwald). Her parents were Joseph Bernhard Kraus, a clerk, and Anna Dorothea née Schmidt. Her father's family, originally from Augsburg, had a small restaurant in Weilbach near Amorbach; her mother was a daughter of the master-builder at Miltenberg, Johann Martin Schmidt. They had fourteen children, of whom 7 died in childhood. Joseph Martin Kraus was a brother of Marianne's. The children studied with Rector Georg Pfister, and Marianne took piano lessons from Cantor Bernhard Franz Wendler. She received more formal education in Mannheim and at the drawing and painting school in Mainz. Later, she studied with the landscape painter Ferdinand von Kobell (1740–1799) in Mannheim; in 1781 with Caspar Schneider (1753–1839) in Mainz; and finally, in 1785–86, with Christian Georg Schütz (1718–1791) and Johann Georg Pforr (1745–1798).

== Career ==
Serving as a lady-in-waiting of Countess Charlotte von Erbach-Erbach und Wartenberg-Roth, in 1791, she undertook a six-month trip to Italy, and met in Rome and Naples artists such as Angelica Kauffman, Jacob Philipp Hackert, and Wilhelm Tischbein. Through her diary, Für mich gemerkt auf meiner Reise nach Italien 1791, she contributed to travel literature; it was first published in 1931, and then again in 1996 by Helmut Brosch.

In 1798, Kraus married Georg Lämmerhirt (1763–1813), court council, and son of a teacher and organist. Lämmerhirt received his education in Göttingen in evangelical theology, but made a career as an administrator. Kraus was the younger talented sister of German composer Joseph Martin Kraus. Her grandson, Karl Friedrich Schreiber (1864–1933), was the first German biographer of Joseph Martin Kraus. She died on 24 May 1838 at Erbach im Odenwald.
