= Buchen =

- Town
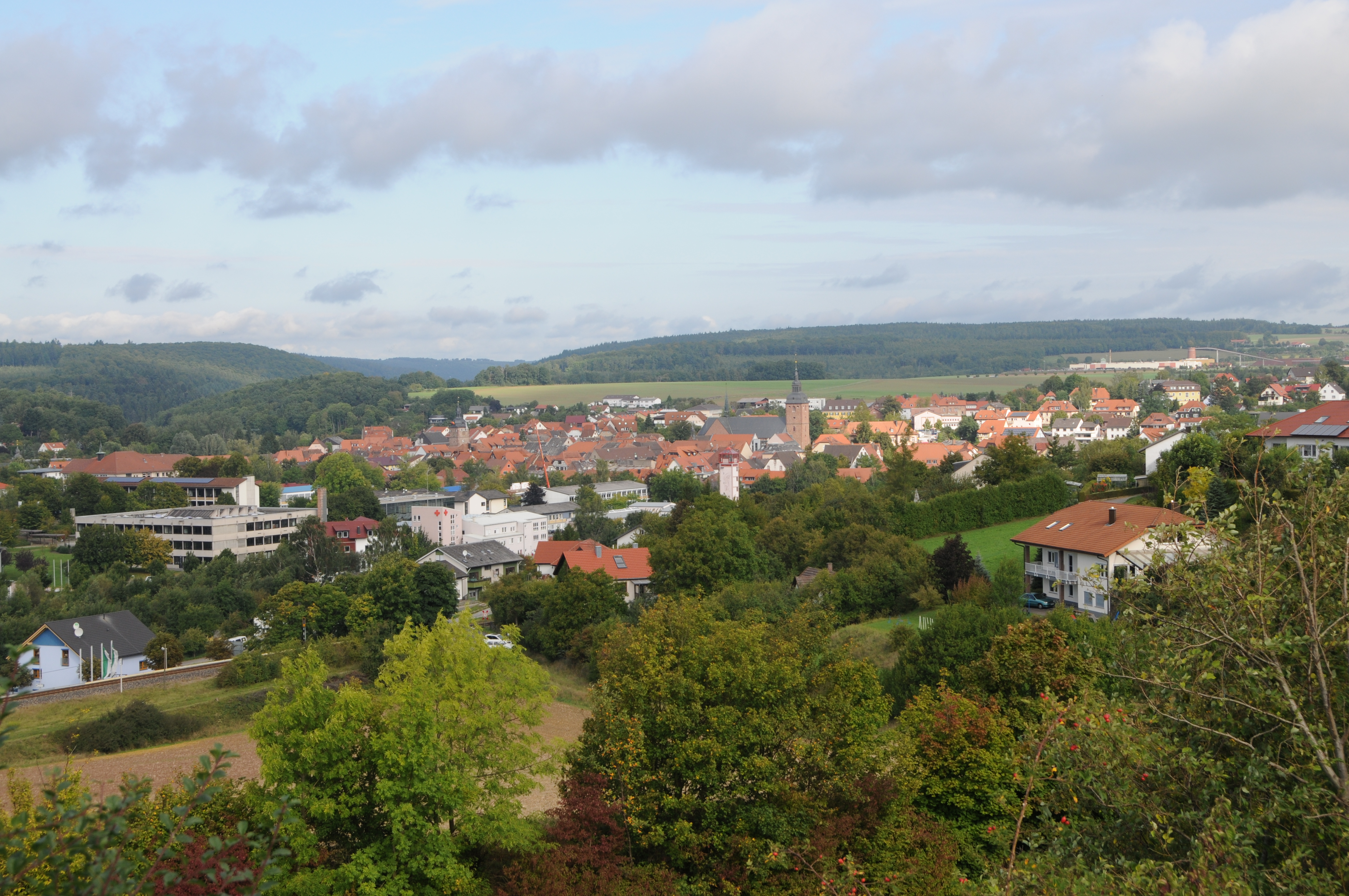
- Buchen, view from Wartberg

- Coat of arms

- Location of Buchen within Neckar-Odenwald-Kreis district
- Interactive map of Buchen
- Location within Germany Location within Baden-Württemberg
- Country: Germany
- State: Baden-Württemberg
- Admin. region: Karlsruhe
- District: Neckar-Odenwald-Kreis
- Subdivisions: 14

Government
  - Mayor (2021–29): Roland Burger (CDU)

Area
  - Total: 138.93 km^{2} (53.64 sq mi)
- Elevation: 337 m (1,106 ft)

Population (2025-12-31)
  - Total: 18,293
  - Density: 131.67/km^{2} (341.03/sq mi)
- Time zone: UTC+01:00 (CET)
  - Summer (DST): UTC+02:00 (CEST)
- Postal codes: 74722
- Dialling codes: 06281, 06286 (Hettigenbeuern), 06287 (Einbach, Waldhausen), 06292 (Eberstadt, Bödigheim)
- Vehicle registration: MOS, BCH
- Website: www.buchen.de

Buchen (German pronunciation: [ˈbuːxn̩]; South Franconian: Buche) is a town in the German state of Baden-Württemberg. It is situated in the Odenwald low mountain range, 23 km northeast of the regional center Mosbach.

== Geography ==
Buchen is situated on the seam between the south-eastern Odenwald and the Bauland area, along the Upper Germanic-Rhaetian Limes. It lies geographically in the triangle formed by the cities of Mannheim, Würzburg and Heilbronn. The precincts of the municipality lie in the Natural Park of the Neckar Valley and the Odenwald and in the Bergstraße-Odenwald Nature Park, at an altitude of between 250 and 500 metres.

== Structure of the city ==
The municipality of Buchen (Odenwald) consists of 14 city areas: Bödigheim, Buchen-City (Buchen-Stadt), Eberstadt, Einbach, Götzingen, Hainstadt, Hettigenbeuern, Hettingen, Hollerbach, Oberneudorf, Rinschheim, Stürzenhardt, Unterneudorf and Waldhausen. The city areas cover the same areas that were occupied by the former townships with the same names, with the exception of the city area called Buchen-Stadt which is officially designated 'Buchen (Odenwald) - .... The city areas are, at the same time, subdivided into 13 residential districts (Wohnbezirke) in terms of the arrangement of municipalities in Baden-Württemberg, whereby the city areas of Buchen-Stadt and Hollerbach are joined into one residential district. With the exception of the city area of Buchen-Stadt, all city areas contain towns (Ortschaften) in terms of the Baden-Württemberg arrangement of municipalities, each having its own town council (Ortschaftsrat) and provost.

To the city area of Bödigheim belong the village of Bödigheim, the farms of Faustenhof, Griechelternhöfe, Rosshof and Sechelseehöfe and the Sägmühle House. To the city area of Buchen-Stadt belongs the town of Buchen (Odenwald). To the city areas of Eberstadt, Götzingen, Hettigenbeuern, Hettingen, Hollerbach, Oberneudorf und Stürzenhardt belong all the villages of the same names. To the city area of Einbach belongs the village of Einbach and the farmstead of Einbacher Mühle. To the city area of Hainstadt belong the village of Hainstadt and the land covered by the Hainstadt train station. To the city area Unterneudorf belong the village of Unterneudorf and the house Unterneudorfer Mühle. To the city area of Waldhausen belong the village of Waldhausen the farmstead Gehöft Glashof.

In the city area of Eberstadt lie the deserted medieval towns of Klarenhof and Reinstadt and in the city area of Götzingen the deserted towns of Rönningen and Buklingen.

== History ==
In Roman times, a wall known as the Limes Germanicus was built in the area as a fortification. Many stretches of this wall are still visible today.

Buchen was first mentioned in the Lorscher Codex, the deeds of the Lorsch Monastery, where it appears as Buchheim, and makes a number of donations to the monastery in the year 773. The location was already populated in prehistoric and in Roman times and in Carolingian times it was under the influence of the Amorbach Monastery, the Reeves (Vogt) of which, the Lords of Dürn, held the rights of jurisdiction over Buchen. In the second half of the 13th Century Buchen was given the right to call itself a city. On the fall of the Lords of Dürn, Buchen was sold in 1303/1309 to the Archbishop of Mainz and remained his territory for 500 years. In 1346 Buchen formed the Federation of Nine Towns ( Neunstädtebund) along with Amorbach, Aschaffenburg, Dieburg, Külsheim, Miltenberg, Seligenstadt, Tauberbischofsheim and Walldürn.

In 1382 the Elector Ruprecht I. failed in an attempt, to break the town during a battle with the Mainz Electorate. The already formidable medieval town fortifications were again strengthened in about 1490 and now even enclosed the western suburbs. During the course of the town's expansion in 1492 the so-called Wartturm on the Wartberg was built higher, and in the same year the so-called Steinerne Bau or ‘Stony Building’ took its place as the seat of the Official belonging to the Electorate of Mainz. The town had early importance as a market town. Alongside the four great Yearly Markets (Shrove Tuesday Market (Fastnachtsmarkt), the May Market, the Jakobi Market und Martin Market) were especially the Yarn, Cloth and Horse Markets as well as the ‘Weekly Market, held every Monday.

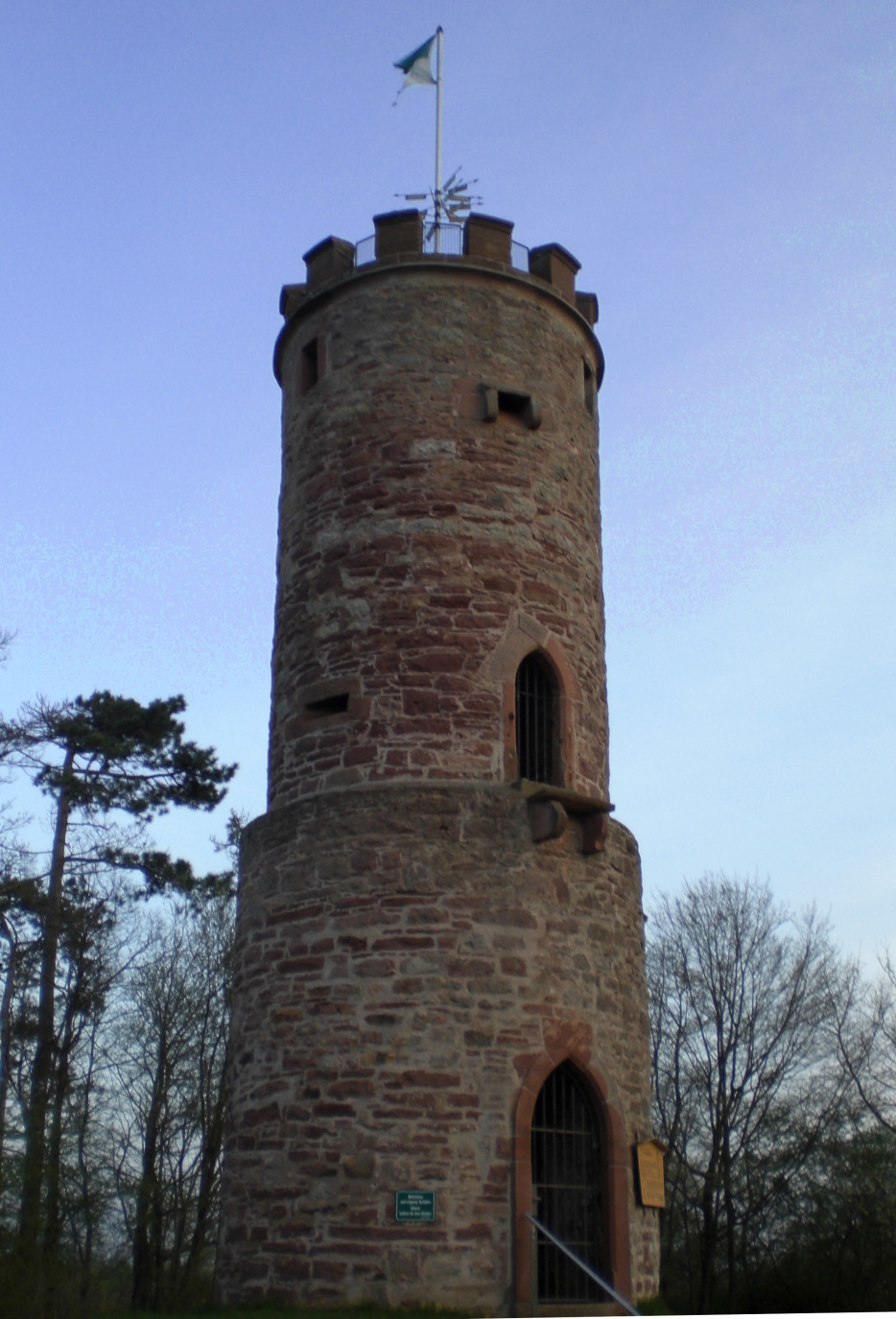
The Wartturm, Buchen

During the Peasants' Revolt in 1525 Götz von Berlichingen was forced to become the leader of the Peasant mob in the courtyard of the Steineres Haus ‘the Stony House’ (nowadays the Museumshof). After the defeat of the Peasants the Nine City Federation of the provincial administration was in fact dissolved, and Buchen lost its right to self-government.

In the Thirty Years War the place was now conquered by the Swedes. These had to yield, however, about 1634 royal troops. On this occasion a great fire broke out in the town, in which 153 houses were sacrificed. The church, the Parsonage, the Upper Mill, the Hausener Court and probably the castle was also destroyed here. Further sacrifices had to be suffered with the arrival of famines and epidemics. Out of 215 citizens and 16 Jews only 29 citizens, 5 widows und 26 houses survived. The fields were poisoned.

In 1688 French troops laid siege to the town. When lightning struck in 1717, a catastrophic fire started in the centre of town, with about half of the buildings in the old town falling victim to the conflagration, including the old Town Hall and the Catholic church.

In 1803, after the dissolution of the electorate of Mainz and as a result of decisions made by national deputies, Buchen was assigned to the Principality of Leiningen, which had been resettled on the orders of Napoleon. In 1806 it was then transferred to the Grand Duchy of Baden. In 1815, three of the city towers were torn down and only the western gate was retained (the Mainzer Tor). The Baden Revolution of 1848/49 also found support in Buchen, and some of its citizens burned the records of the Leiningen rent offices. Despite the failure of the revolution, the citizens retained some of the rights they had fought for.

Buchen was already the seat of a district office (Amt) in the Prince Elector Era of Mainz. This position as centre of administrative power kept the city under the rule by Leining and Baden. In 1938 the Bezirk administration of Buchen became the Landkreis of Buchen.

Eventually leading to the Final Solution all across Germany, on November 9–10, 1938 the Kristallnacht, or November Pogrom, also resulted in synagogues in Buchen and Bödigheim being ransacked, looted and desecrated. After being deported to concentration camps, the 34 inhabitants of Jewish faith who had been living in Buchen as of the 1933 census, at least 13 were killed. The former common cemetery in Bödigheim still bears witness to the earlier life of the Jewish community in the close-knit, surrounding area, which was otherwise predominantly Catholic or Lutheran (Sindolsheim).

During the course of the district reforms in 1973, the county seat of Buchen was dissolved and the city was incorporated into the Neckar Odenwald District.

== Incorporation of new areas ==
Thirteen new localities were incorporated into Buchen as a result of the municipality reforms up to 1975: Stürzenhardt in 1971; Unterneudorf in 1972; Oberneudorf, Bödigheim, Waldhausen and Einbach in 1973; Götzingen, Hainstadt, Hettigenbeuern, Hettingen and Rinschheim in 1974; and, finally, Eberstadt and Hollerbach in 1975. In 1986 the 'Home Days' for Baden-Württemberg took place for the first time.

== Politics ==
=== The Municipal Council ===
The local elections of the 13th of June 2004 produced the following results:

Party	Votes	+/-	Seats	+/-
CDU (Christian Democratic Union)	64,0 %	(+1,8)	18	(+1)
FWV (Free Voters' Union)	21,8 %	(−0,2)	7	(=)
SPD (Social Democratic Party of Germany)	14,2 %	(+1,4)	4	(=)
Others	0,0 %	(−3,0)	0	(=)

=== Mayor ===
Since February 2006 Roland Burger has been the mayor of the city of Buchen. He had previously been the mayor of the city of Osterburken (since February 1991). The former mayor of Buchen became a county commissioner (Landrat) for the NOK in Mosbach.

=== The coat of arms ===
The blazon of the Buchen municipal coat of arms is as follows: Argent (silver), two branches flanking a beech tree growing from the center of a trimount, vert (green), with a leaning shield, gules (red), placed against the trunk, upon which a six-spoked Wheel of Mainz, argent, is placed.

=== Coats of arms of the former townships ===
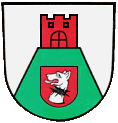
- Bödigheim
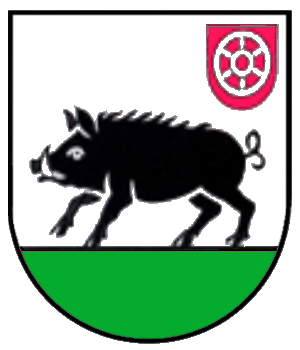
- Eberstadt
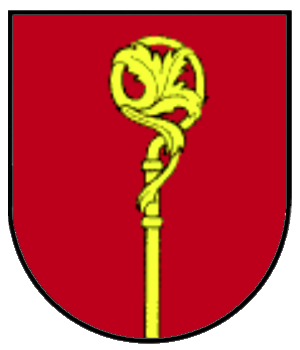
- Einbach
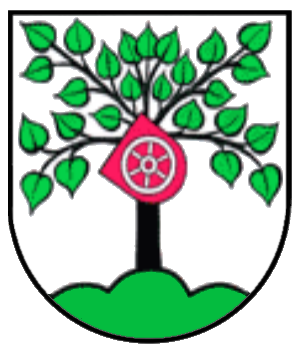
- Götzingen
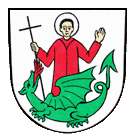
- Hainstadt
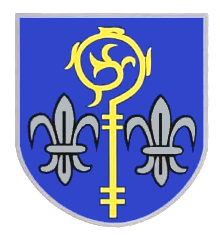
- Hettingen
- Hettigenbeuern
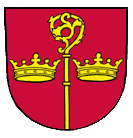
- Hollerbach
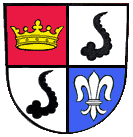
- Oberneudorf
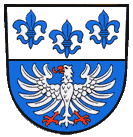
- Rinschheim
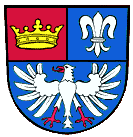
- Stürzenhardt
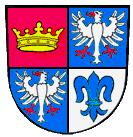
- Unterneudorf
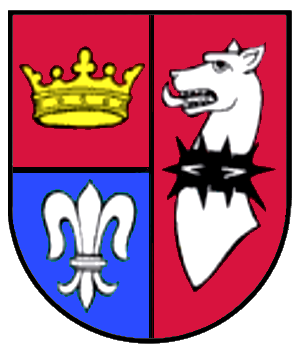
- Waldhausen

== Economy and infrastructure ==
Ideally located halfway between the Neckar and Main rivers, Buchen enjoys a favorable geographic location which has allowed it to develop infrastructure and transport connections conducive to production, retail and commercial businesses, the skilled trades and service providers while attracting a highly skilled workforce to the region.

The District Hospital in Buchen serves the whole area, and there are also a number of senior citizens’ assisted living centers. Buchen offered one of the first housing facilities in Germany based on the assisted living concept.

== Transport ==
Buchen can be reached via Bundesautobahn 81, Adelsheim/Osterburken exit, the main road (from the south) or from the Tauberbischofsheim exit, Bundesstrasse 27 (from the north) and also via the A6 by taking the Sinsheim, B292 and B27 exit (from the southwest).

The Buchen (Odenwald) railway station is on the rail line connecting Seckach and Miltenberg (KBS 709, also called the Madonnenlandbahn), which has a further stop at Buchen Ost (Buchen East). Railway services are run by the Westfrankenbahn. Bus service between smaller towns and villages is operated by the Rhein-Neckar-Verkehr GmbH (rnv), which has an extensive network of light rail, tram and bus routes in Mannheim, Heidelberg and Ludwigshafen and the greater region.

Stuttgart Airport and Frankfurt (am Main) Airport are both about 100 km away. The closest airport, for aircraft with a MTOW of 5.7 tons or less, is the Walldürn Airfield. The nearest inland port is Wertheim am Main.

== Authorities, courts and public establishments ==
Buchen is the seat of a local court (Amtsgericht), which belongs to the court circuit of Mosbach. Furthermore, in Buchen-Hainstadt is the headquarters of the regional office of the Archbishopric of Freiburg for the region of Odenwald-Tauber, to which belong the Deanery of Mosbach-Buchen and the home of the Bishop of Tauber.

== Educational institutions ==
Buchen has a wide variety of schools, as a result of which many students commute daily to the former county town. There is a technical vocational school, with a high school for those who want to specialize in engineering or information technology; a high school for general education; a technical school for social education; a home economics school; as well as several secondary modern schools, junior schools, primary schools and special schools.

== Media ==
Media in Buchen include:

- Fränkische Nachrichten ("Franconian News"), published in Buchen/Walldürn with Buchen editorial department
- Rhein-Neckar-Zeitung ("Rhine-Neckar Newspaper"), published as Nordbadische Nachrichten with local editorial department and printshop n Buchen

Buchen has a correspondent's office of South-West Broadcasting (Südwestrundfunk) and since 1951 there has been a transmitter for the company (the Buchen-Walldürn transmitter) in the north-west of the city, in Walldürner Straße. Until 1993, the first station of South-West Broadcasting was being broadcast over this transmitter on the middle-wave frequency 1485 kHz, although support for the antenna was a 60-metre-high (200 ft) unharnessed, steel-framed mast that served as a self-beaming mast fed from the nadir and insulated against earthing. In 1993, the medium-wave service was tweaked and the VHF (very high frequency) antenna on its tip was expanded. As a result, it was not only increased in height but also made to cover a greater area. Since there were no more plans to receive the medium wave transmissions, the guy wires of the uppermost level were not provided with isolators.

== Culture and sights ==
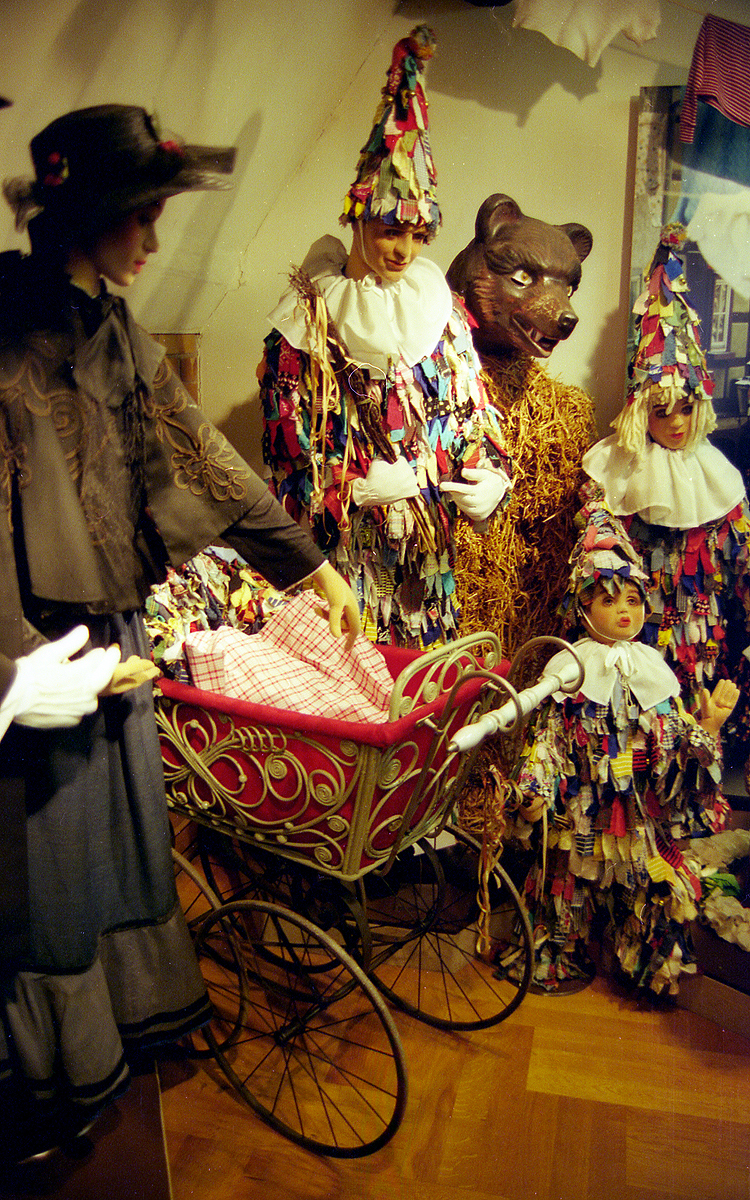
Display of Buchen carnival characters in the Faschenachtsmuseum

Buchen lies on the Siegfriedstraße, a 300-km tourist route originating in Worms, also called the Nibelungen and Siegfried Route featuring many sights.

=== Theatres ===
- Productions of the Baden Regional Theatre (Badische Landesbühne)
- The ‘Buchen in concert’ subscription concert series brings leading concert artists to Buchen, from soloists to quartets and symphonies, to perform attractive programming, including one cabaret evening each year

=== Museums and cultural institutions ===
- The Regional Museum of Buchen (with the Joseph Martin Kraus Memorial Square)
- The Culture Forum Vis-à-Vis (presenting, among other things, exhibitions of the Neckar-Odenwald Art Society).
- The City Library
- The Adult Education Centre
- The City Joseph Martin-Kraus Music School
- The City Home Library ‘Between the Neckar and the Main“
- The Library of Judaism
- The Hermann Cohen Academy for Religion, Science and Art
- The International Joseph Martin Kraus Society
- The memorial marking the former synagogue
- The City Archives
- The commemorative plaque for the victims of fascism in the old Jewish cemetery, with the names of eight Jewish victims of the Holocaust from Kleineichholzheim
- A memorial plaque at number 35 Vorstadtstrasse, commemorating the destruction of the synagogue during the Nazi regime
- Faschenachtsmuseum – a small display of carnival characters and memorabilia in the Guildhall of the Faschenachtsgesellschaft Narrhalla, tours by previous appointment

=== The Eberstadt Stalactite Cave ===
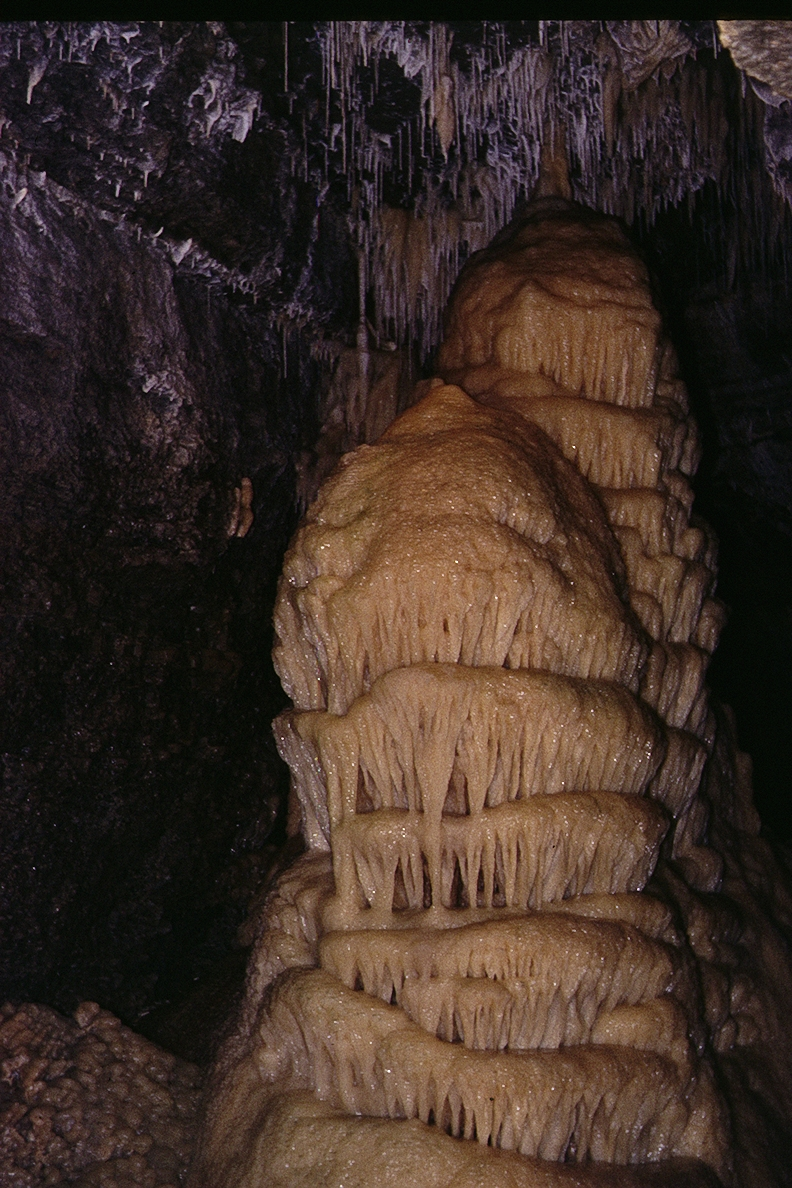
The 'Wedding Cake'; the Stalactite Cave in Eberstadt

The Eberstadt Stalactite Cave (Tropfsteinhöhle) is approximately 600 yards long and is estimated to be three to five million years old. It has been open to the public for tours since 1973 and is part of the Geo-Naturpark Bergstrasse-Odenwald). The cave contains a wide range of stalactites, including very slender examples and highly conical stalagmites, flags of calc-sinter, terraces of calc-sinter and crystals. Because the cave remained sealed after being discovered and electric lighting has always been used for visitor tours since 1973, the stalactites are generally still as white as chalk, unlike most older German caves that are open to the public where black soot has discolored the stalactites from historical use of open candle and torch flames for lighting.

=== Further sights and buildings ===
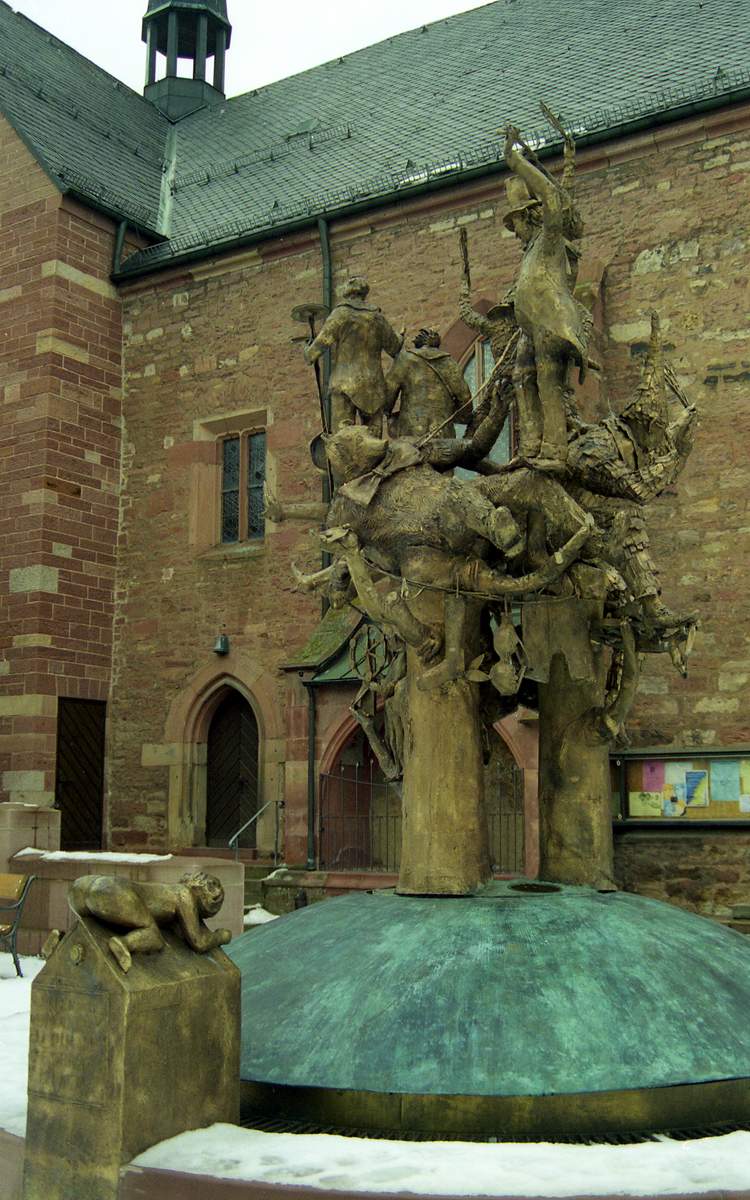
The Narrenbrunnen fountain (by Joseph Neustifter) in the Upper Marketplace depicts characters from Buchen's carnival, including the legendary naked Blecker (foreground, left)

- The Roman Upper Germanic-Rhaetian Limes, the greatest ground monument in Europe runs round the edge of the city area Walldürn through Buchen, in the direction of Osterburken. Until around the year 260 the Romans used the Limes as a protective wall keeping them safe from the Alamanni and from other Germanic tribes. They built it all the way from Rheinbrohl a distance of 500 km up to the Danube
- One of the original buildings by the architect Egon Eiermann, the annex to the Hotel Prinz Carl built in 1967, in which the rooms and features created by him are still in use (since then it has been ascribed as belonging to the classical modern style)
- Where the present-day town of Bödigheim now stands the knight Wiprecht Rüdt built a castle in the year 1286; at the end of the 16th Century it was upgraded into a Renaissance palace. Between 1712 and 1720 the new Castle (Schloss) of Rüdt von Collenberg was built by Johann Jakob Rischer in Bödigheim
- The ruins of a Jewish Mikveh in Bödigheim
- The Old Town Hall (Hallen-Rathaus) in the centre of the old town
- The Wartberg (on the hill called the Wartberg)

=== Regular Events ===
- Fastnacht (Shrove Tuesday Night): the annual 'Faschenacht' festivities in Buchen have attracted thousands of visitors to the area every year for as long as anyone can remember. During the annual 'Fasching' pageant it is compulsory to at least kiss the backside of the symbolic figure, whose origins date back to the Middle Ages, the Buchen Blecker.
- Goldener Mai (Golden May) – Live jazz music combos perform at various pubs, restaurants and locales throughout Buchen. On the first Saturday in May of each year (not to be held in 2020 due to the COVID-19 pandemic)
- The Vorsommerfest (Pre-Summer Festival) – Brass bands in the courtyard of the museum (Museumshof) on a weekend in the middle of June – including the Cellerbar ('Zeitmaschine': Time-machine) on Saturday. Organized by the City Band and the Catholic Church Choir (not to be held in 2020 due to the COVID-19 pandemic)
- The Schützenmarkt [Marksmens' Club], a traditional regional fair held annually during the first week of September, with market stalls for shopping and amusement rides and food stands (not to be held in 2020 due to the COVID-19 pandemic)
- The Buchen Cult-Night has been "combined" with Golden May on the same weekend in recent years (not to be held in 2020 due to the COVID-19 pandemic)
- OW-ART (Art from the Odenwald), the Odenwald art fair, initiated by the artist Patris Semma and held at the Stadthalle Buchen

== Notable people ==
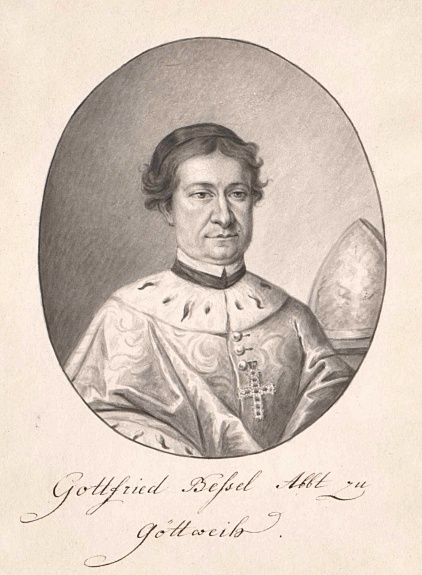
Gottfried Bessel, 1730

- Konrad Wimpina (ca.1465-1531), Roman Catholic theologian and humanist.
- Gottfried Bessel (1672-1749), benedictine abbot and scholar.
- Joseph Martin Kraus (1756–1792), court composer in Stockholm and contemporary of Mozart, grew up locally
- Marianne Kraus (1765-1838), painter, travel writer and lady-in-waiting, sister of Joseph Martin Kraus
- Wilhelm Emelé (1830-1905), painter of horses, military and hunting scenes.
- Franz Josef Wittemann, (1868-1931) politician (centre), member of the Landtag & State President
- Pia Bauer (1871–1954), nurse in a cancer hospital, received the Florence Nightingale Medal in 1933
- Wilhelm Schnarrenberger (1892-1966) painter, associated with the New Objectivity.
- Marshall Prentice (1919–1976), LSO officer of the Military Government responsible for Buchen district 1948–49, Honorary Citizen of Buchen (1949), street named in his honor in 2017: Marshall-Prentice-Straße
- Ulrike Ballweg (born 1965), assistant coach of the Germany women's national football team
- Simon Lorenz (born 1997), footballer who has played over 200 games
- Benedikt Gimber (born 1997), footballer who has played over 225 games
