= Konrad Wimpina =

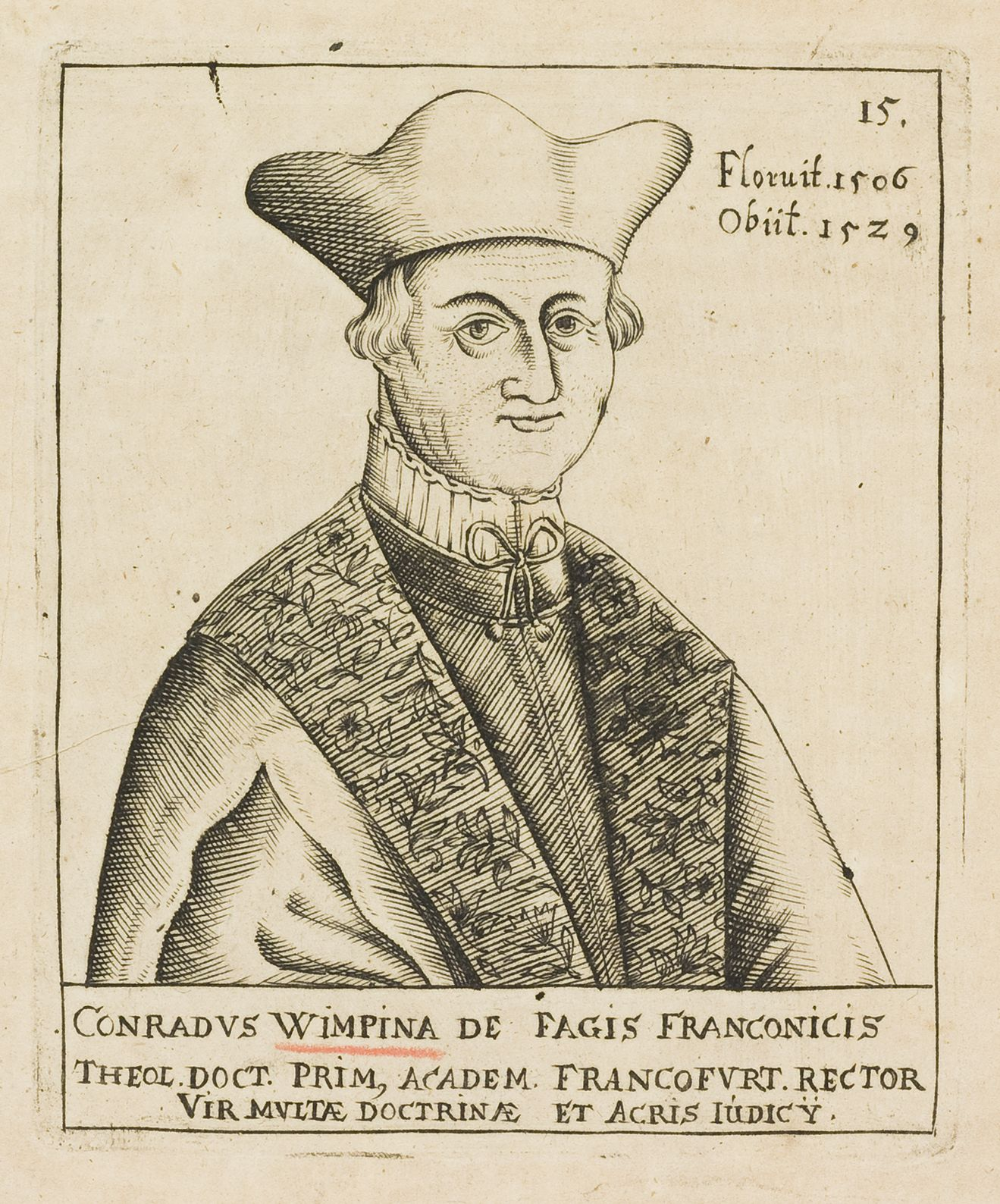
Konrad Wimpina

Konrad Wimpina (Wiminae, Wiminesis; real name Konrad Koch) (b. at Buchen in Baden, about 1465; d. at Amorbach in Lower Franconia, 17 May 1531) was a German Roman Catholic theologian and humanist of the early Reformation period. He was a conservative, considered quiet but somewhat narrow. In theology he was a pupil of Martin Polich of Mellerstadt and a Thomist.

== Life ==
His family, whose name was Koch, came from Wimpfen on the Neckar, hence he was called Wimpina. He matriculated at the University of Leipzig (1479–1480) and remained there until 1505; in 1481 he obtained the baccalaureate degree, and in 1485 was made magister.

In 1491 he was made a member of the philosophical faculty. One of his students at this time was Georg Simler, who went on to teach at the renowned Latin school in Pforzheim, where the twelve-year-old Philipp Melanchthon was one of Simler's best students.

In 1494, Wimpina was appointed rector at the Universitz of Leipzig, and in 1494–1495 dean. Having taken the theological course, he was made cursor in 1491 and sententiarius in 1494; in 1502 he received the degree of licentiate.

He was ordained at Würzburg, in 1495, as subdeacon, about 1500 as priest. He received the degree of Doctor of Theology from Cardinal-Legate Peraudi at Leipzig, 1503.

In 1505 Elector Joachim I of Brandenburg called Wimpina to Frankfort-on-the-Oder to organize the new university and to be its first rector; he was several times dean of the theological faculty.

From 1500–1504, in a dispute with his former instructor Polich, Wimpina defended theology and Polich poetry, each attacking the other with exaggerated and personal abuse. Wimpina was one of Martin Luther's first opponents. In 1518 he defended the legend that St. Anne had three husbands in succession and had a child Mary, by each one of them (De d. Annae trinubio), against Sylvius Egranus, in whose defence Luther took part.

In the dispute over indulgences Wimpina composed the theses which Johann Tetzel debated at Frankfurt, 20 January 1518. These theses contained the doctrine of the Catholic Church, but on the question of indulgences for the dead maintained merely a Scholastic opinion, preached by Tetzel.

He received canonries in the cathedrals of Brandenburg and Havelberg, and in 1530 took part in the Diet of Augsburg as theologian of the Elector Joachim. At the Diet Wimpina, with John Mensing, Redorfer, and Elgersma, drew up, against Luther's seventeen Swabian articles, the "Christlichen Unterricht gegen die Bekanntnus M. Luthers". Wimpina was commissioned to confute the "Confessio Augustana" (Augsburg Confession), and took part in the disputation about reunion.

Afterwards, he accompanied the Elector to Cologne for the election of King Ferdinand. He then retired to Baden.

== Works ==
His first publication, "Ars epistolandi" (1486), and a poem in praise of the university and city of Leipzig (1488) are of little importance. In 1493 Wimpina claimed in the "Tractatus de erroribus philosophorum" that Aristotle was wrong in various propositions which disagreed with dogma. As rector he delivered several orations that show wide reading.

He also wrote a series of treatises and held disputations against Luther's doctrine. His polemics are combined in the "Anacephalaeosis" (1528), one of the most complete refutations offered of Lutheranism.
