= Proserpin (Kraus) =

Proserpin is a Swedish-language opera by Joseph Martin Kraus to a libretto by the poet Johan Henrik Kellgren following a plot drafted by Gustav III himself from Philippe Quinault's Proserpine. The opera was premiered at Ulriksdal Palace on 6 June 1781 for one performance. The opera was revived at the Drottningholm Theatre in 1980 under Arnold Östman. The opera was performed with a new German libretto at the Schwetzingen Festival in 2006.

Kraus wrote to his parents on 20 June 1780 that he had received from the King's secretary a text by "the best poet in Sweden"; by 14 September he wrote again that he had almost finished the score. By the following March Kraus was able to report that his opera was in rehearsal, although there were subsequent delays before the June premiere.

== Roles ==
Role	Voice type	Premiere Cast (Conductor: – )
Proserpin, Daughter of Jupiter and Ceres	soprano	
Ceres, Proserpin's mother	soprano	
Cyane, Proserpin's nymph	soprano	
Atis, Cyane's lover, also in love with Proserpin	tenor	
Pluto, god of the Lower World and Jupiter's brother, also in love with Proserpin	baritone	
Jupiter, the highest god	baritone	
Mercurius, Jupiter's messenger	tenor	
A Bacchant / Faun	tenor	
Sicilians, nymphs, bacchants

== Synopsis ==
The opera is set in Sicily. There, young mortal Atis has fallen in love with the goddess Proserpin (Proserpina), daughter of Jupiter and the fertility goddess Ceres, and for her finally abandons his fiancée Cyane. Pluto, god of the underworld, hears her fury, is also in love with Proserpin and abducts her to his realm after locating her with the help of Cyane. In Sicily, everyone is searching in vain for Proserpin. Ceres appears in a deep sorrow when she discovers what has happened, and fails to start the summer. Atis's grief at her loss is such that he jumps into Mount Etna to end his life. Cyane follows him to the underworld hoping for a concession from Pluto, who had promised her a reunion with Atis for her betrayal. She is able to emerge from the underworld with Atis and inform Ceres about her daughter's new home there. As Ceres neglects her tasks on earth because of her grief and the harvests get worse, Jupiter has a plan. He allows his messenger Mercury to announce that Proserpin will in future live alternately with him and with her mother on earth. In the closing scene, he descends from heaven to personally bless the marriage between Pluto and Proserpin and ensures a general reconciliation.

== Recording ==
- Stephen Smith (tenor), Anna Eklund-Tarantino (soprano), Jan Stromberg (tenor), Hillevi Martinpelto (soprano), Johan Christensson (tenor), Lars Arvidson (bass), Susanne Ryden (soprano), Peter Mattei (baritone) Stockholm Chamber Choir, Stockholm Chamber Orchestra, conductor Mark Tatlow. Musica Sveciae 2CD
