= Pia Bauer =

Pia Bauer (5 February 1871 – 10 December 1954) was a nurse in a cancer hospital who has a German award named for her.

In 1933 she received the Florence Nightingale Medal, awarded by the International Committee of the Red Cross for "exceptional courage and devotion to the wounded, sick or disabled or to civilian victims of a conflict or disaster" or "exemplary services or a creative and pioneering spirit in the areas of public health or nursing education".
