= Bertil H. van Boer =

American musicologist (born 1952)

- Born: October 2, 1952; Tallahassee, Florida
- Occupations: Musicologist, composer, conductor, violist
- Writing career
- Subjects: Musicology, Mozart scholarship

Bertil H. van Boer (born October 2, 1952) is an American musicologist, composer, conductor and violist.

== Life and career ==
Bertil Hermann van Boer studied at the University of California, Berkeley. He received his Master of Arts at the University of Oregon and his PhD in Music History from Uppsala University.

Van Boer is Professor of Music at Western Washington University. He is a foreign member of the Royal Swedish Academy of Music.

== Selected bibliography ==
- Bertil van Boer: Die Werke von Joseph Martin Kraus. Systematisch-thematisches Werkverzeichnis, Stockholm: Kungl. Musikaliska akademien 1988
- Bertil van Boer: Dramatic Cohesion in the Music of Joseph Martin Kraus, Lewiston 1989 (Studies in History and Interpretation of Music Number, Vol. 15) ISBN 978-0-88946-440-7
- Bertil van Boer (ed.): Gustav III and the Swedish Stage. Opera, Theatre, and Other Foibles, Lewiston 1993 (Studies in History and Interpretation of Music Number, Vol. 40) ISBN 978-0-7734-9314-8
- Bertil van Boer: The Operas of Joseph Martin Kraus, in: Gustavian Opera – Swedish Opera, Dance and Theatre 1771–1809, Stockholm 1991 ISBN 978-91-85428-64-9
- Bertil van Boer: Gustavian Opera: An Overview, in: Gustavian Opera – Swedish Opera, Dance and Theatre 1771–1809, Stockholm 1991 ISBN 978-91-85428-64-9
- Bertil van Boer: The Case of the Circumstantial Meeting: Wolfgang Amadeus Mozart and Joseph Martin Kraus in Vienna, in: Eighteenth-Century Music, vol.1 no. 1, Cambridge 2004 pp. 85–90.
- Bertil H. van Boer: Historical Dictionary of Music of the Classical Period, Scarecrow Press, 2012. ISBN 978-0-8108-7183-0.
- Bertil H. van Boer: The musical life of Joseph Martin Kraus : letters of an eighteenth-century Swedish composer, Bloomington: Indiana University Press, 2014. ISBN 978-0-253-01274-6
- van Boer, Bertil (March 8, 2019). Music in the Classical World: Genre, Culture, and History. New York, London: Routledge. doi:10.4324/9781315145570. ISBN 978-1-315-14557-0.
