= List of ship launches in 1858 =

The list of ship launches in 1858 includes a chronological list of some ships launched in 1858.

Date	Ship	Class	Builder	Location	Country	Notes
1 January	Antigua	Clipper	Messrs. A. M'Millan & Son	Dumbarton	United Kingdom	For John Kerr.
1 January	David William Pickering	Schooner	Griffith Thomas	Barmouth	United Kingdom	For David William Pickering and others.
1 January	Flying Fish	Barque	J. M. Reed	Pallion	United Kingdom	For Messrs. Cavan Bros.
1 January	Georgetown	Barque	Messrs. R. Thompson & Sons	Sunderland	United Kingdom	For Messrs. Cavan Bros.
1 January	Leopard	Steamship	Messrs. Brownlow & Lumsden	Hull	United Kingdom	For William B. Brownlow and others.
1 January	Plover	Barque	Messrs. R. Thompson & Sons	Sunderland	United Kingdom	For Messrs. Cavan Bros.
1 January	Sea Wave	Barque	J. Hardie	Southwick	United Kingdom	For Mr. Tweddell.
1 January	Unnamed	Barque	James Robinson	North Hylton	United Kingdom	For private owner.
2 January	Bartolomeo Diaz	Steam yacht	Messrs. Green	Blackwall	United Kingdom	For Pedro V of Portugal.
2 January	Camellia	Barque	N. Stothard	Pallion	United Kingdom	For Mr. Robinson.
2 January	Champion	Merchantman	Camper	Gosport	United Kingdom	For Messrs. Beale.
2 January	Clarence	Full-rigged ship	W. Pile	Sunderland	United Kingdom	For John Hay.
2 January	Ocean Pearl	Schooner	James Bannister	Tarleton	United Kingdom	For James Ashcroft, Hugh Forshaw and James Taylor.
2 January	Westburn	Clipper	Messrs. W. Hood & Co.	Aberdeen	United Kingdom	For Mr. Nicol.
2 January	Unnamed	Brig	Messrs. Rawson & Watson	Sunderland	United Kingdom	For private owner.
2 January	Unnamed	Barque	Stothard	Pallion	United Kingdom	For Mr. Robinson.
4 January	Dover Castle	Full-rigged ship	Haswell	Sunderland	United Kingdom	For John Hay.
4 January	Standard	Barque	William Pile	Sunderland	United Kingdom	For Mr. Kelso.
9 January	Tasmanian	Steamship	Messrs. Laurence Hill &. Co.	Port Glasgow	United Kingdom	For European and Australian Royal Mail Company.
14 January	Countess of Fife	Merchantman	T. H. Wood	Sunderland	United Kingdom	For Mr. Anderson.
14 January	The Mary	Barque	W. H. Pearson	Sunderland	United Kingdom	For private owner.
16 January	British Queen	Clipper	Messrs. A. Duthie & Co.	Aberdeen	United Kingdom	For private owners.
18 January	Edith Moore	Full-rigged ship	W. C. Miller	Toxteth	United Kingdom	For Charles Moore & Co.
25 January	The Royal Bride	Steamship	Messrs Hyde & Co.	Bristol	United Kingdom	For Messrs. Mileses & Kingston.
30 January	Polestar	Barque	Messrs Samuelson & Co.	Hull	United Kingdom	For Messrs. Cotesworth, Lyne & Co.
31 January	Great Eastern	Paddle steamer	J Scott Russell & Co	London	United Kingdom	For Eastern Steam Navigation Co. The largest ship built to date.
January	Catherine	Merchantman		Rhyl	United Kingdom	For private owner.
January	Delhi	Mersey flat	John Anderton	Runcorn	United Kingdom	For private owner.
January	Unnamed	Full-rigged ship	James Briggs	Pallion	United Kingdom	For Messrs. Bradley & Potts.
1 February	Benares	Steamship	Messrs. Tod & McGregor	Greenock	United Kingdom	For Peninsular and Oriental Steam Navigation Company.
8 February	Bremen	Steamship	Messrs. Caird & Co.	Glasgow	United Kingdom	For Bremen and New York Steam Packet Company.
13 February	Challenger	Pearl-class corvette		Woolwich Dockyard	United Kingdom	For Royal Navy.
13 February	Norah Greame	Full-rigged ship	Belfast Steam-Ship Building Company	Belfast	United Kingdom	For George Bates.
15 February	Ann Law	Brig	Messrs. David Burns & Co.	Aberdeen	United Kingdom	For private owners.
16 February	Alea	Schooner	Camper	Gosport	United Kingdom	For private owner.
17 February	Flying Dutchman	Schooner	Messrs. Hanson's	Cowes	United Kingdom	For private owner.
17 February	Lincolnshire	Clipper	Messrs. Money Wigram & Sons	Poplar	United Kingdom	For private owner.
17 February	Lily	Schooner	William Bayley & Sons	Ipswich	United Kingdom	For Ebenezer Goddard and Mr. Peck.
February	Cornubia	Steamship	Harvey & Co.	Hayle	United Kingdom	For Hayle and Bristol Steam Packet Company.
February	Lady Alice	Clipper			United Kingdom	For The Passengers' Line of Packets.
1 March	De Brys	Steamship		Middlesbrough	United Kingdom	For private owner.
2 March	Ellie	Schooner	J. Roberts	Nefyn	United Kingdom	For R. Hughes.
2 March	Imperator Aleksandr	Steamship	John Laird	Birkenhead	United Kingdom	For Imperial Russian Government.
3 March	Surinam	Merchantman	Messrs. James McMillan & Son	Greenock	United Kingdom	For John Kerr.
3 March	The Oaklands	Barque	H. Follett	Shaldon	United Kingdom	For Mr. Clarke.
13 March	Dania	Paddle steamer	Messrs. Caird & Co.	Greenock	United Kingdom	For H. P. Prior.
13 March	Annie	Brig	Messrs. Bowman & Drummond	Blyth	United Kingdom	For Messrs. William Winship & Co.
15 March	Eclipse	Steamship	Messrs. Morton	Leith	United Kingdom	For private owner.
16 March	Alliance	Schooner	Messrs. Trewick, Sons & Co.	Amlwch	United Kingdom	For Messrs. J. Palmer & Co.
16 March	Meridian	Schooner		Aberystwyth	United Kingdom	For Richard Francis and others.
17 March	Carmel	Schooner	Walters	Exmouth	United Kingdom	For Mr. Popham.
17 March	Eclipse	Clipper	Anderson	Granton	United Kingdom	For private owner.
17 March	Eclipse	Barque	Thomas Wright	Aberdeen	United Kingdom	For private owner.
17 March	Mary	Barque	Messrs. Hall	Footdee	United Kingdom	For Mr. McKay.
18 March	Nova Scotian	Steamship	Messrs. W. Denny & Bros.	Dumbarton	United Kingdom	For Montreal Ocean Steamship Company.
20 March	Aleksandr	Steamship	Messrs. C. & W. Earle	Hull	United Kingdom	For Imperial Russian Government.
30 March	Not named	Barque	Innes	Leith	United Kingdom	Speculative build.
31 March	New York	Steamship	Messrs. Caird & Co.	Greenock	United Kingdom	For private owner.
31 March	Northam	Steamship	Messrs. Summers & Day	Northam	United Kingdom	For Peninsular and Oriental Steam Navigation Company.
March	Lady Alice	Barque	James Hardie	Sunderland	United Kingdom	For A. O. Wilkinson.
March	Surcouf	Aviso		Rochefort	France	For French Navy.
1 April	Wasp	Steamship		Paisley	United Kingdom	For Mr. Hetherington.
3 April	James	Sloop	John Anderton	Runcorn	United Kingdom	For private owner.
6 April	Warhawk	Yacht	M. Ratsey	Cowes	United Kingdom	For J. W. Cannon.
14 April	Queen of Hindustan or Queen of India	Full-rigged ship	W. Briggs, or J. Reed	Sunderland	United Kingdom	For W. Brass.
15 April	Edinburgh	Steamship	Messrs. S. & H. Morton	Leith	United Kingdom	For private owner.
15 April	Hero	Agamemnon-class ship of the line		Chatham Dockyard	United Kingdom	For Royal Navy.
16 April	Elizabeth	Schooner	Thomas Price	Pill	United Kingdom	For James Smith.
17 April	Palestine	Steamship	Messrs. R. Steele & Co.	Greenock	United Kingdom	For Messrs. Burns.
20 April	Test	Brig	Vaux	Harwich	United Kingdom	For Mr. Vaux.
1 May	Pilot	Schooner	Richard Cliffe	Castleford	United Kingdom	For private owner.
1 May	Vianna	Steamship	T. D. Marshall	South Shields	United Kingdom	For Messrs. Vianna, Chappel & Co. Collided with the barque Rossendale on being launched. Rossendale sank.
5 May	Douglas	Paddle steamer	Robert Napier and Sons	Glasgow	United Kingdom	For Isle of Man Steam Packet Company.
7 May	Princeza de Joinville	Paddle Steamer	Messrs. John & Robert White	West Cowes	United Kingdom	For Imperial Brazilian Government.
11 May	Kanaris	Steamship	James Laing	Southwick	United Kingdom	For E. T. Gourlay & Co.
12 May	Caledonienne	Galliot		Brest	France	For French Government.
12 May	Topaze	Liffey-class frigate		Devonport, Dockyard	United Kingdom	For Royal Navy.
13 May	Havelock	Paddle steamer	Messr. J. & G. Thompson	Govan	United Kingdom	For Dublin and Glasgow Steam Packet Company
13 May	James & Eleanor	Snow	Bowman and Drummond	Blyth	United Kingdom	For John Dobson & Co.
15 May	Grace Peile	Barque	Messrs. Chaloner, Hart & Sinott	Liverpool	United Kingdom	For Mr. Sawyers.
17 May	Integrity	Sloop	Messrs. Hazlehurst & Son	Hull	United Kingdom	For J. B. Lowther.
21 May	Griffin	Steam yacht	Messrs. Laurence Hill & Co.	Greenock	United Kingdom	For James Baird.
26 May	Rainbow	Paddle steamer	John Laird	Birkenhead	United Kingdom	For Macgregor Laird.
27 May	Ellen and Ann	Fishing smack	Messrs. Gibson & Butcher	Fleetwood	United Kingdom	For Thomas Wright and Mrs. Blundell.
27 May	Sagres	Corvette	Messrs. Young, Sons & Magnay	Limehouse	United Kingdom	For Portuguese Navy.
28 May	Wildfire	Schooner	Robinson	Gosport	United Kingdom	For J. F. Turner.
29 May	Forté	Imperieuse-class frigate		Deptford Dockyard	United Kingdom	For Royal Navy.
May	Arcona	Corvette		Danzig	Prussia	For Prussian Navy.
May	Chinchas	Merchantman		Richibucto	(United Kingdom of Great Britain and Ireland) Colony of New Brunswick	For J. W. Holderness.
May	Cleveland	Clipper	Messrs. T. & W. Smith	Newcastle upon Tyne	United Kingdom	For private owner.
May	Swetlana	Frigate	MM Arnand et Cie	Bordeaux	France	For Imperial Russian Navy.
11 June	Huguenot	Clipper	W. Duthie	Aberdeen	United Kingdom	For John T. Rennie.
11 June	Mary Rowlands	Schooner	H. Hughes	Porthdinllaen	United Kingdom	For T. Williams.
12 June	Ceylon	Steamship	Messrs. Samuda Bros.	Poplar	United Kingdom	For Peninsular and Oriental Steam Navigation Company.
12 June	Cordelière	Corvette		Lorient	France	For French Navy.
12 June	Hudson	Steamship	Messrs. Palmer, Brothers, & Co.	Newcastle upon Tyne	United Kingdom	For Norddeutscher Lloyd.
12 June	Jason	Clipper	Messrs. Walter Hood & Co.	Aberdeen	United Kingdom	For private owner.
12 June	Margaret Ann	Schooner	Robert Banister	Tarleton	United Kingdom	For W. Ball, H. Breakell, T. Hindle and Joseph Whiteside.
12 June	Melrose	Barque	J. Hardie	Sunderland	United Kingdom	For R. Soutter.
12 June	Orlando	Mersey-class frigate		Pembroke Dockyard	United Kingdom	For Royal Navy.
12 June	Sea Serpent	Steamship	Victoria Iron Works	Greenwich	United Kingdom	For private owner.
14 June	Finnart	Steam yacht	Messrs. Tod & MacGregor	Partick	United Kingdom	For John MacGregor.
15 June	Hebrides	Steam yacht	Messrs. John Scott & Sons	Greenock	United Kingdom	For Royal Northern Yacht Club.
16 June	Mercur	Paddle Steamer	R. Napier & Sons	Glasgow	United Kingdom	For Österreichischer Lloyd.
18 June	Mary Catherine	Schooner	Messrs. Hughes, Thomas & Co	Amlwch	United Kingdom	For private owner.
21 June	Sir Walter Raleigh	Paddle steamer	Messrs. Henderson & Son	Renfrew	United Kingdom	For private owner.
28 June	Daniel Rankin	Clipper	Messrs. Denny & Rankin	Dumbarton	United Kingdom	For Messrs. Potter, Wilson & Co.
28 June	John Middleton	Snow	E. Potts	Seaham	United Kingdom	For Mr. Middleton.
29 June	Ellen Rodger	Barque	Messrs. Robert Steele & Co.	Greenock	United Kingdom	For Mr. Rodger.
29 June	Standart	Imperial Yacht		Bordeaux	France	For Alexander II of Russia.
30 June	Francis	Barque	H. Claughton	Bristol	United Kingdom	For private owner.
June	Azela	Brig	Messrs. Gaddy & Lamb	Newcastle upon Tyne	United Kingdom	For private owner.
June	Calmouk	Transport ship		Astrakhan	Russia	For Imperial Russian Government.
June	Venilia	Full-rigged ship	Messrs. W. J. Fraser & Co.	Miramichi	(United Kingdom of Great Britain and Ireland) Colony of New Brunswick	For private owner.
2 July	Kalevala	Corvette	Jörgensen	Turku	(Russian Empire) Grand Duchy of Finland	For Finnish Navy.
10 July	Ann Dunn	Barque	Robert Thompson Jr.	Sunderland	United Kingdom	For L. Dunn.
10 July	Westmoreland	Barque	William Watson	North Hylton	United Kingdom	For Messrs. Thomson & Co.
10 July	Ziba	Clipper	Messrs. Hall	Aberdeen	United Kingdom	For Mr. Tomlinson and Mr. Wade.
12 July	Baltic	Steamship	Messrs. C. & W. Earle	Hull	United Kingdom	For Messrs. Thomas Wilson, Sons, & Co.
12 July	Etheldreda	Merchantman	S. Peter Austin	Sunderland	United Kingdom	For William Stevens.
12 July	Verulam	Clipper	S. Peter Austin	Sunderland	United Kingdom	For William Stevens.
13 July	Naval Brigade	East Indiaman	Messrs. T. Young & Sons	South Shields	United Kingdom	For Messts. T. Young & Sons.
14 July	Deerhound	Steam yacht	John Laird	Birkenhead	United Kingdom	For Duke of Leeds.
17 July	Sjaelland	Frigate		Copenhagen	Denmark	For Royal Danish Navy.
20 July	Santa Catarina	Schooner	Ring	Strood	United Kingdom	For Mr. Appleyard.
23 July	John Adams	schooner	Some of the crew of the American clipper Wild Wave	Pitcairn Island	(United Kingdom) Pitcairn Island	For themselves
24 July	Boyana	Gunboat	Thompson	Rotherhithe	United Kingdom	For Ottoman Navy.
26 July	Georgina	Merchantman	W. Briggs	Sunderland	United Kingdom	For private owner.
26 July	Moravian	Full-rigged ship	Messrs. Walter Hood & Co.	Aberdeen	United Kingdom	For Messrs. George Thompson Jr. & Co.
28 July	Valiant	Fishing smack	Messrs. Lister & Trenery	Gainsborough	United Kingdom	For Mr. Hellyer.
29 July	Sir Richard	Schooner		Beaumaris	United Kingdom	For private owner.
29 July	Undaunted	Fishing smack	Messrs. Lister & Trenery	Gainsborough	United Kingdom	For James Westcott.
31 July	São Luiz	Paddle steamer	W. C. Miller	Toxteth	United Kingdom	For Maranham Steam Packet Company.
July	Acacia	Barque	G. Booth	Sunderland	United Kingdom	For Denton & Co.
July	Bilboa	Steamship	Robinson	Cork	United Kingdom	For private owner.
July	Brooklyn	Sloop-of-war	Jacob A. Westervelt & Sons	New York	United States	For United States Navy.
July	Gartsherrie	Barque	William Cotnam	Quebec	(United Kingdom of Great Britain and Ireland) Province of Canada	For private owner.
July	The Duke of Argyle	Fishing boat		Iona	United Kingdom	For private owner.
July	Surge	Cutter	Messrs. Fyffe	Fairlie	United Kingdom	For C. T. Couper.
July	Wallace	Full-rigged ship		Quebec	(United Kingdom of Great Britain and Ireland) Province of Canada	For private owner
July	Widders	Sloop	Brundrit & Whiteway	Runcorn	United Kingdom	For private owner.
7 August	Simla	Steamship	John Laird	Birkenhead	United Kingdom	For Messrs. Charles Moore & Co.
7 August	Ville de Nantes	Ville de Nantes-class ship of the line	Arsenal de Cherbourg	Cherbourg	France	For French Navy.
10 August	Castle Howard	Full-rigged ship	Taylor & Scouler	Sunderland	United Kingdom	For Mr. Greenwell.
10 August	Elizabeth Richards	Schooner		Pensarn	United Kingdom	For private owner.
10 August	Northerner	Cutter	Messrs. D. Burns & Co.	Aberdeen	United Kingdom	For private owner.
10 August	Powerful	Full-rigged ship	William Cotman	Quebec	(United Kingdom of Great Britain and Ireland) Province of Canada	For private owner.
10 August	Simla	Full-rigged ship	Messrs. Peto, Brassey & Co.	Birkenhead	United Kingdom	For Messrs. Charles Moore & Co.
11 August	Omeo	Steamship	Messrs. A. Leslie & Co	Hebburn	United Kingdom	For private owner.
12 August	Osbourne House	Steamship	Messrs. John Pile & Co.	West Hartlepool	United Kingdom	For Richard Young.
13 August	Mersey	Mersey-class frigate		Chatham Dockyard	United Kingdom	For Royal Navy.
14 August	Pindare	Paddle steamer	W. C. Miller	Toxteth	United Kingdom	For Maranham Steam Packet Company.
18 August	Edmund Blunt	Pilot boat	Edward F. Williams	Greenpoint, New York	United States	For Abraham Jones, Josiah Johnson Jr., Frank Penay and Louis Sampson.
21 August	Heather Bell	Paddle steamer	Messrs. J. & G. Thomson	Govan	United Kingdom	For private owners.
25 August	Cologne	Paddle steamer	Messrs. Westwood, Baillie, and Campbell	Millwall	United Kingdom	For General Steam Navigation Company.
26 August	Windsor Castle	First rate		Pembroke Dockyard	United Kingdom	For Royal Navy.
28 August	Clio	Pearl-class corvette		Sheerness Dockyard	United Kingdom	For Royal Navy.
August	Bayan	Frigate		Bordeaux	France	For Imperial Russian Navy.
August	Calvados	Transport ship		Bordeaux	France	For French Navy.
August	Narvaez	Steamship		Ferrol	Spain	For Spanish Navy.
August	Natalie	Full-rigged ship		Quebec	(United Kingdom of Great Britain and Ireland) Province of Canada	For private owner.
August	Victorine	Merchantman	M. Armand	Bordeaux	France	For private owner.
2 September	Diana	Sloop of war		Ferrol	Spain	For Spanish Navy.
3 September	General Admiral	Frigate	William H. Webb	New York	United States	For Imperial Russian Navy.
9 September	Knight Errant	Full-rigged ship	Messrs. M. Samuelson & Co.	Hull	United Kingdom	For Messrs. G. H. Fletcher & Co.
23 September	Donegal	Conqueror-class ship of the line		Devonport Dockyard	United Kingdom	For Royal Navy.
24 September	Glenmore	Barque		Garmouth	United Kingdom	For private owners.
25 September	Hungarian	Steamship	William Denny & Bros.	Dumbarton	United Kingdom	For Allan Line.
26 September	Sinop	First rate		Nicholaieff Admiralty Shipyard	Russia	For Imperial Russian Navy.
September	Maria	Full-rigged ship		Quebec	(United Kingdom of Great Britain and Ireland) Province of Canada	For private owner.
September	Notre Dame de Fourvières	Steamship	M. Normand	Le Havre	France	For private owner.
September	Peerless	Full-rigged ship		Quebec	(United Kingdom of Great Britain and Ireland) Province of Canada	For private owner.
4 October	Kaiser	Ship of the line		Pola Navy Yard	Austrian Empire	For Austrian Navy.
9 October	Panope	Steamship	Messrs. John Reid & Co.	Port Glasgow	United Kingdom	For Greek Government.
20 October	Lancaster	Sloop-of-war		Philadelphia Navy Yard	United States	For United States Navy.
21 October	Weser	Steamship	Messrs. Palmer & Co.	Jarrow	United Kingdom	For Norddeutscher Lloyd.
22 October	Icarus	Racer-class sloop		Deptford	United Kingdom	For Royal Navy.
23 October	Edgar	Agamemnon-class ship of the line		Woolwich Dockyard	United Kingdom	For Royal Navy.
30 October	Governor Douglas	Steamship		Victoria	(United Kingdom of Great Britain and Ireland) Colony of Vancouver Island	For private owner.
October	Carrie Ladd	Sternwheeler	John T. Thomas	Oregon City	(United States) Oregon Territory	For Jacob Kamm, John C. Ainsworth and others.
October	Comet	Merchantman	Messrs. White	Cowes	United Kingdom	For private owner.
October	Deptford Packet	Schooner	G. Short	Sunderland	United Kingdom	For T. Henderson.
October	Royal Charlie	West Indiaman	Messrs. White	Cowes	United Kingdom	For private owner.
October	Saint Dunstan	Barque	R. Thompson & Sons	Sunderland	United Kingdom	For Burnett & Co.
4 November	Little Western	Steamship	James Henderson & Son	Renfrew	United Kingdom	For Scilly Isles Steam Navigation Company.
6 November	Cornelie	Corvette		Toulon	France	For French Navy.
8 November	Parramatta	Paddle steamer	Thames Iron Ship Building Company	Millwall	United Kingdom	For Royal Mail Steam Packet Company.
9 November	Zebra	Steamship	Messrs. Brownlow & Co.	Hull	United Kingdom	For Messrs. Brownlow & Co.
13 November	Earl of Southesk	Barque	William Stephen	Arbroath	United Kingdom	For Mr. Carnegie.
16 November	Carrier	Train ferry	Scotte & Co.	Greenock	United Kingdom	For Edinburgh & Northern Railway.
20 November	Salto	Paddle steamer	Messrs. J. & G. Thompson	Govan	United Kingdom	For Company Saltena.
22 November	Hartford	Sloop-of-war		Boston Navy Yard	United States	For United States Navy.
27 November	Eliza Anderson	Paddle steamer	Samuel Farman	Portland	(United States) Oregon Territory	For Columbia River Steam Navigation Company.
November	Cleopatra	Paddle steamer	John Scott Russell	Glasgow	United Kingdom	For El Hami Pasha.
November	Yorkshire Lass	Fishing smack	Messrs. McCann & Armstrong	Hull	United Kingdom	For private owner.
2 December	Fontenoy	Suffren-class ship of the line		Toulon	France	For French Navy.
18 December	Aigle	Imperial yacht		Cherbourg	France	For Napoleon III.
22 December	A. Milano	Merchantman		Genoa	Kingdom of Sardinia	For private owner. Renamed L'Unito on the orders of the local authorities. A. Milano was a soldier who had attempted to assassinate King Ferdinand II of the Two Sicilies.
22 December	Jeddo	Steamship	John Laird	Birkenhead	United Kingdom	For Peninsular and Oriental Steam Navigation Company.
Summer	General Neill	Full-rigged ship		Quebec	(United Kingdom of Great Britain and Ireland) Province of Canada	For private owner.
Autumn	Golden Rocket	Clipper		Brewer, Maine	United States	For Moses Giddings & E. S. Doyle.
Autumn	Storm King	Full-rigged ship		Quebec	(United Kingdom of Great Britain and Ireland) Province of Canada	For private owner.
Unknown date	Ada	Cutter	Camper	Gosport	United Kingdom	For H. F. Barclay.
Unknown date	Ada Letitia	Merchantman	Liddle & Sutcliffe	Sunderland	United Kingdom	For private owner.
Unknown date	Admiral Kanaris	Merchantman	James Laing	Sunderland	United Kingdom	For S. Xenos.
Unknown date	Adriatic	Ship of the line		Pola	Austrian Empire	For Austrian Navy.
Unknown date	Advance	Brigantine		Near Saint John	(United Kingdom of Great Britain and Ireland) Colony of New Brunswick	For private owner.
Unknown date	Ajax	Tug		Savannah, Georgia	United States	For private owner.
Unknown date	Albatross	Steamship		Mystic, Connecticut	United States	For private owner.
Unknown date	Amanda	Barque		New York	United States	For private owner.
Unknown date	Anglo-Indian	Barque	W. Briggs	Sunderland	United Kingdom	For W. Briggs.
Unknown date	Annie	Merchantman	J. Lister	Sunderland	United Kingdom	For private owner.
Unknown date	Ann Taylor	Merchantman	William Doxford	Sunderland	United Kingdom	For R. Taylor.
Unknown date	Asia	Steamship	James Laing	Sunderland	United Kingdom	For J. Laing.
Unknown date	Beatrice	Barque	George Barker	Sunderland	United Kingdom	For Burnett & Co.
Unknown date	Boldon Lawn	Merchantman	Todd & Brown	Sunderland	United Kingdom	For Mr. Tweddell.
Unknown date	Bolina	Barque	James Robinson	North Hylton	United Kingdom	For Mr. Hodgson.
Unknown date	Branch	Schooner	William Adamson	Sunderland	United Kingdom	For William Adamson.
Unknown date	Brandon	Merchantman	Richard Thompson	Sunderland	United Kingdom	For Mr. Hepworth.
Unknown date	Brierly Hill	Barque	Austin Mills	Sunderland	United Kingdom	For J. & S. Pegg.
Unknown date	Broadwater	Full-rigged ship	Sykes & Co.	Sunderland	United Kingdom	For J. Weller.
Unknown date	Brother's Pride	Full-rigged ship		Sackville	(United Kingdom of Great Britain and Ireland) Colony of New Brunswick	For private owner.
Unknown date	Cedar	Merchantman	W. Briggs or J. Reed	Sunderland	United Kingdom	For Mr. Richardson.
Unknown date	Champion	Fishing smack	William Ashburner	Barrow-in-Furness	United Kingdom	For private owner.
Unknown date	Cobrero	Barque	J. Haswell	Sunderland	United Kingdom	For Ridley & Co.
Unknown date	Concord	Merchantmen	G. Hick & Co.	Sunderland	United Kingdom	For Hick & Co.
Unknown date	Cornelia	Merchantman	M. Clarke	Sunderland	United Kingdom	For A. Ray.
Unknown date	Crested Wave	Barque	J. Denniston	Sunderland	United Kingdom	For Ayre & Co.
Unknown date	Czar	Steamship	Messrs. Samuelson & Co.	Hull	United Kingdom	For Messrs. Samuelson & Co.
Unknown date	Derwent	Schooner	G. W. Hall	Sunderland	United Kingdom	For Mr. Davidson.
Unknown date	Deva	Merchantman			(United Kingdom of Great Britain and Ireland) India	For private owner.
Unknown date	Dona Anita	Barque	James Robinson	North Hylton	United Kingdom	For Mr. Seymour.
Unknown date	Duchess	Barque	Rawson & Watson	Sunderland	United Kingdom	For Mr. Davison.
Unknown date	Eastern Province	Barque	Peverall & Davison	Sunderland	United Kingdom	For Mr. Falconer.
Unknown date	Eleanor	Merchantman	George Barker	Sunderland	United Kingdom	For W. Tullock.
Unknown date	Eleanor	Merchantman	J. Hardie	Sunderland	United Kingdom	For R. & R. Souter.
Unknown date	Electra	Merchantman	Brown & Johnson	Sunderland	United Kingdom	For Kenrick & Co.
Unknown date	Elizabeth Douthwaite	Merchantman	J. Davison	Sunderland	United Kingdom	For Mr. Douthwaite.
Unknown date	Empress	Barque	W. Pickersgill	Sunderland	United Kingdom	For private owner.
Unknown date	Enmore	Full-rigged ship	Green Shipbuilders	Bristol	United Kingdom	For Michael Cavan and Company.
Unknown date	Eslington	Merchantman	James Robinson	North Hylton	United Kingdom	For Mr. Rennison.
Unknown date	Far West	Merchantman	N. Stothard	Sunderland	United Kingdom	For Mr. Denniston.
Unknown date	First	Merchantman		Sunderland	United Kingdom	For private owner.
Unknown date	Frances	Merchantman	W. Petrie	Sunderland	United Kingdom	For H. Tanner.
Unknown date	General Havelock	Merchantman	P. Foster	Sunderland	United Kingdom	For Fareall & Co.
Unknown date	General Havelock	Barque	Peverall & Davison	Sunderland	United Kingdom	For D. Davison.
Unknown date	Generous	Merchantman	J. Barkes	Sunderland	United Kingdom	For J. Barkes.
Unknown date	Glenalm	Merchantman	Richard Thompson	Sunderland	United Kingdom	For private owner.
Unknown date	Glendower	Barque	W. Pile	Sunderland	United Kingdom	For J. Brodie & Co.
Unknown date	Glendower	Full-rigged ship	James BRiggs	Sunderland	United Kingdom	For Mr. Balkwell.
Unknown date	Gratitude	Mersey flat	William Ashburner	Barrow-in-Furness	United Kingdom	For private owner.
Unknown date	Gwydir	Smack	Brundrit & Whiteway	Runcorn	United Kingdom	For Brundrit & Whiteway.
Unknown date	Holmesdale	Full-rigged ship	J. Reed	Sunderland	United Kingdom	For William Phillipps.
Unknown date	Honor	Brigantine	W. R. Abbay, or Abbay & Co.	Sunderland	United Kingdom	For Hodge & Co.
Unknown date	James	Brig	W. H. Pearson	Sunderland	United Kingdom	For Skerry & Co.
Unknown date	James Gray	Tug		Philadelphia, Pennsylvania	United States	For private owner.
Unknown date	Jessamine	Clipper		Saint John	(United Kingdom of Great Britain and Ireland) Colony of New Brunswick	For private owner.
Unknown date	Joachim Christian	Merchantman	J. Robinson	Sunderland	United Kingdom	For J. Pflugk.
Unknown date	John & Isabella	Barque	Jopling & Willoughby	Sunderland	United Kingdom	For J. Fenwick.
Unknown date	John & Jane	Merchantman	George Bartram & Sons	Sunderland	United Kingdom	For George Bell, Robert Bell, Taylor Dixon and Thomas Dunn.
Unknown date	J. W. Morris	Schooner	James Pile	Sunderland	United Kingdom	For J. Morris.
Unknown date	Kensington	Steamship	J. W. Lynn	Philadelphia	United States	For private owner.
Unknown date	Lady Constance	Merchantman	W. Taylor	Sunderland	United Kingdom	For William Hill.
Unknown date	Lady Havelock	Merchantman	Green & Richardon	Sunderland	United Kingdom	For Mr. Banfield.
Unknown date	Lady Inglis	Merchantman	Richard Thompson	Sunderland	United Kingdom	For J. Twizell.
Unknown date	Lady Luck	Merchantman	J. Hardie	Sunderland	United Kingdom	For private owner.
Unknown date	Lark	Snow	R. H. Potts & Bros	Sunderland	United Kingdom	For Potts Bros.
Unknown date	Lucknow	Merchantman	G. Booth	Sunderland	United Kingdom	For R. Pellier.
Unknown date	Lucknow	Barque		Dundee	United Kingdom	For private owner.
Unknown date	Madgie	Steamship		Philadelphia, Pennsylvania	United States	For private owner.
Unknown date	Malabar	Steamship			United Kingdom	For Peninsular and Oriental Steam Navigation Company.
Unknown date	Malvern	Merchantman	Austin & Mills	Sunderland	United Kingdom	For Wilson & Co.
Unknown date	Mantura	Snow	Rawson & Watson	Sunderland	United Kingdom	For Gallon & Co.
Unknown date	Marathon	Merchantman	C. W. Crown	Sunderland	United Kingdom	For A. Tindall.
Unknown date	Maravi	Barque	D. A. Douglas	Sunderland	United Kingdom	For J. Ray .
Unknown date	Margaretta	Barque	Messrs. Robert Steele & Co	Greenock	United Kingdom	For Messrs. Baine & Johnston.
Unknown date	Maria Asumpta	Brig	Nicholas Pida	Badalona	Spain	For private owner.
Unknown date	Maria Denning	Paddle steamer		Cincinnati, Ohio	United States	For private owner.
Unknown date	Mary	Merchantman	J. Spence	Sunderland	United Kingdom	For private owner.
Unknown date	Mary & Elizabeth	Barque	T. Stonehouse	Sunderland	United Kingdom	For T. Stonehouse.
Unknown date	Mary & Martha	Snow	G. Gardener	Sunderland	United Kingdom	For T. Carter.
Unknown date	Mary Shepherd	Full-rigged ship	J. Briggs	Sunderland	United Kingdom	For Mr. Shepherd.
Unknown date	Midnight	Merchantman	Green & Richardson	Sunderland	United Kingdom	For private owner.
Unknown date	Milo	Merchantman	James Laing	Sunderland	United Kingdom	For E. T. Gourley.
Unknown date	Minx	Schooner	James Robinson	Sunderland	United Kingdom	For W. Jenkins.
Unknown date	M. M. Peter	Merchantman	W. Naizby	Sunderland	United Kingdom	For Robert Peter.
Unknown date	Montgomery	Steamship		New York	United States	For private owner.
Unknown date	Moravian	Clipper		Aberdeen	United Kingdom	For Aberdeen Clipper Line.
Unknown date	Netherby	Full-rigged ship	Robert Thompson Jr.	Sunderland	United Kingdom	For Black Ball Line.
Unknown date	Norden	Clipper	Herr Schutlow	Stettin	Prussia	For Herr Schutlow.
Unknown date	North Briton	Steamship		River Clyde	United Kingdom	For Montreal Ocean Steamship Company.
Unknown date	Nymph	Fishing trawler	John Barter	Brixham	United Kingdom	For John Barter, James Evans and others.
Unknown date	Orontes	Merchantman	W. Naizby	Sunderland	United Kingdom	For T. Reed.
Unknown date	Ost	Clipper	Herr Schutlow	Stettin	Prussia	For Herr Schutlow.
Unknown date	Percy	Barque	P. Gibson	Sunderland	United Kingdom	For James Donkin.
Unknown date	Peri	Cutter	Ratsey	Cowes	United Kingdom	For Mr. Cannon.
Unknown date	Phantom	Fishing trawler	John Barter	Brixham	United Kingdom	For John Barter, James Evans and others.
Unknown date	Polly	Barque	G. Gardner	Sunderland	United Kingdom	For Mr. Wheatley.
Unknown date	Prima Donna	Medium clipper	Greenman & Co.	Mystic, Connecticut	United States	For John A. McGaw.
Unknown date	Princess Royal	Humber Keel			United Kingdom	For William G. England.
Unknown date	Queen of Asia	Merchantman	J. Mills	Sunderland	United Kingdom	For private owner.
Unknown date	Retriever	Barque	James Laing	Sunderland	United Kingdom	For Cavan Bros.
Unknown date	Reullura	Merchantman	W. Pile	Sunderland	United Kingdom	For J. Brodie.
Unknown date	Royal Bride	Merchantman	Hodgson & Gardner	Sunderland	United Kingdom	For Shotton & Co.
Unknown date	Royal Bride	Merchantman	William Doxford	Sunderland	United Kingdom	For private owner.
Unknown date	Saint Bede	Merchantman	W. Pickersgill	Sunderland	United Kingdom	For Elliott & Co.
Unknown date	Sarah Black	Merchantman	W. Pickersgill	Sunderland	United Kingdom	For W. Black.
Unknown date	Scoresby	Merchantman	G. Shevill	Sunderland	United Kingdom	For W. Black.
Unknown date	Sea Flower	Merchantman	J. Allcock	Sunderland	United Kingdom	For Mr. Alcock.
Unknown date	Sea Swallow	Barque	Rawson & Watson	Sunderland	United Kingdom	For Mr. Thompson.
Unknown date	Shantung	Full-rigged ship	J. Briggs	Sunderland	United Kingdom	For T. Betts.
Unknown date	Slater	Merchantman	T. Seymour	Sunderland	United Kingdom	For Preston & Co.
Unknown date	Speculator	Merchantman	Ratcliffe & Spence	Sunderland	United Kingdom	For Mr. Ratcliffe .
Unknown date	Staindrop	Snow	Austin & Mills	Sunderland	United Kingdom	For Wilson & Co.
Unknown date	Star of Eve	Merchantman	W. Pile	Sunderland	United Kingdom	For Brodie & Co.
Unknown date	Star of Peace	Clipper	N. Currier, Jr.	Newburyport, Massachusetts	United States	For Charles Hill & Co. and M. Davenport.
Unknown date	Süd	Clipper	Herr Schutlow	Stettin	Prussia	For Herr Schutlow.
Unknown date	Sunniside	Merchantman	Denton	Sunderland	United Kingdom	For Alcock & Co.
Unknown date	Swan	Merchantman	R. Wilkinson	Sunderland	United Kingdom	For Thompson & Co.
Unknown date	Tramp	Brigantine	T. H. Wood	Sunderland	United Kingdom	For Mr. Jeffrey.
Unknown date	Unity	Fishing smack	Messrs. McCann & Armstrong	Hull	United Kingdom	For private owner.
Unknown date	Useful	Brig		River Wear	United Kingdom	For private owner.
Unknown date	Valeria	Merchantman	George Barker	Sunderland	United Kingdom	For W. Mills.
Unknown date	Vancouver	Barque		Quebec	(United Kingdom of Great Britain and Ireland) Province of Canada	For private owner.
Unknown date	Veritas	Merchantman	D. A. Douglas	Sunderland	United Kingdom	For Murray & Co.
Unknown date	Victoria	Paddle steamer		Elizabeth, Pennsylvania	United States	For private owner.
Unknown date	Wanderer	Schooner		New York	United States	For private owner.
Unknown date	Westen	Clipper	Herr Schutlow	Stettin	Prussia	For Herr Schutlow.
Unknown date	Young Dixon	Barque	J. Robinson	Sunderland	United Kingdom	For W. Dixon.
Unknown date	Zillah	Merchantman	Sykes & Co	Sunderland	United Kingdom	For Wright & Co.
Unknown date	Name unknown	Merchantman	W. Thackeray	Sunderland	United Kingdom	For private owner.
