= French ship Sané =

Three ships of the French Navy have borne the name of Sané, in honour of the 18th-century French engineer Jacques-Noël Sané.

== French ship named Sané ==
- French frigate Sané (1847), a paddle frigate
- French cruiser Sané (1872), an Infernet-class cruiser
- French submarine Sané (1916), a Dupuy de Lôme-class submarine
Ships of the French Navy named Sané
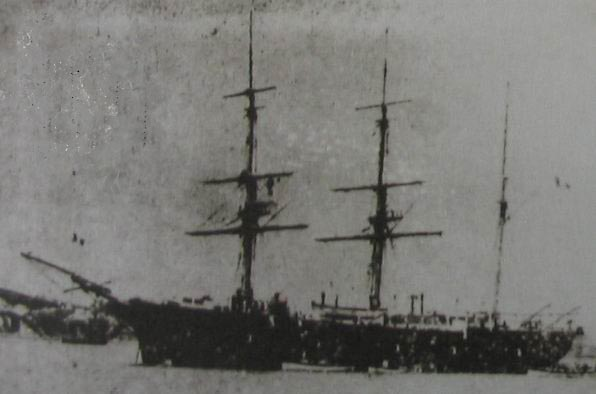
The paddle frigate Sané (1847)

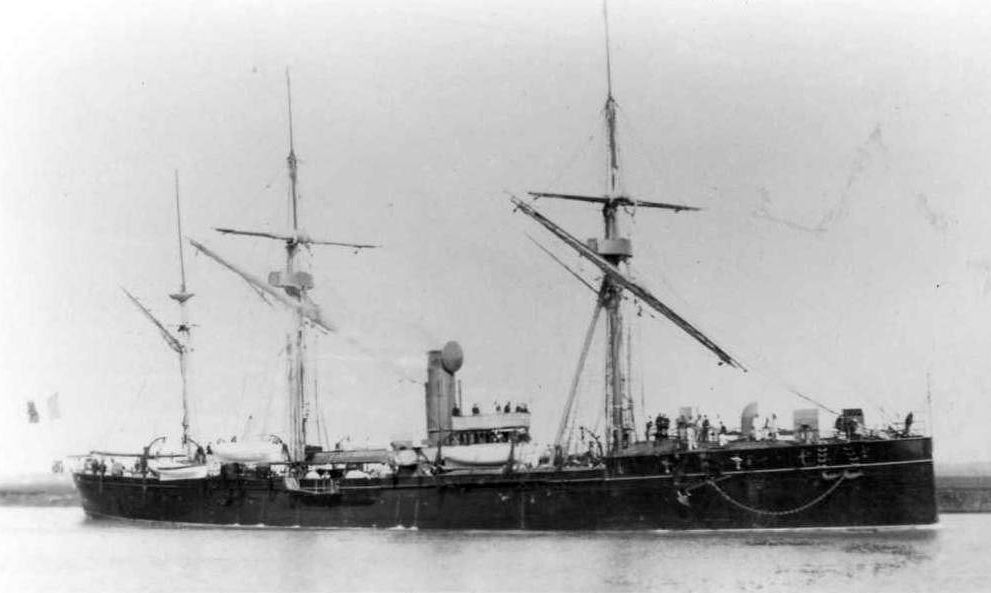
The cruiser Sané (1872)

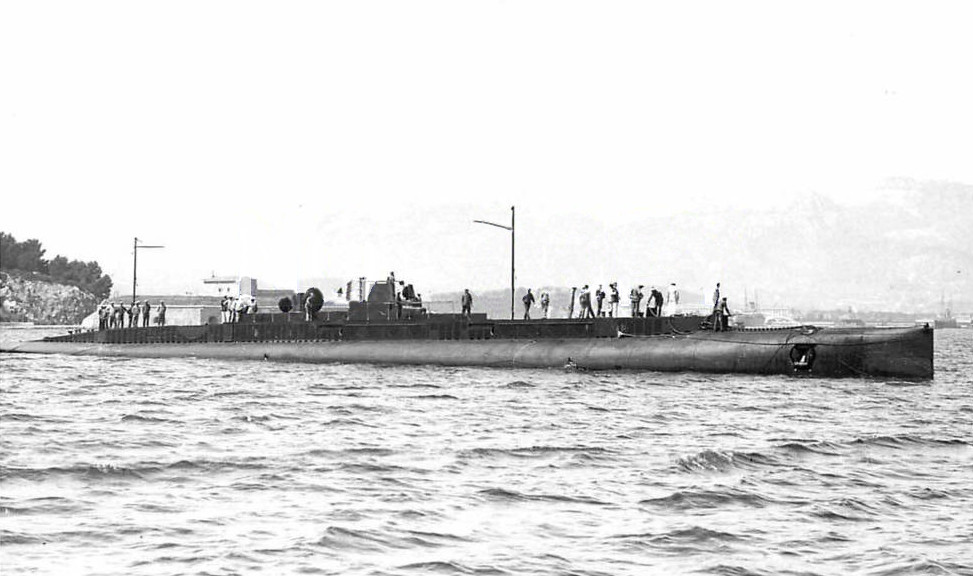
The submarine Sané (1916) in her 1916 configuration

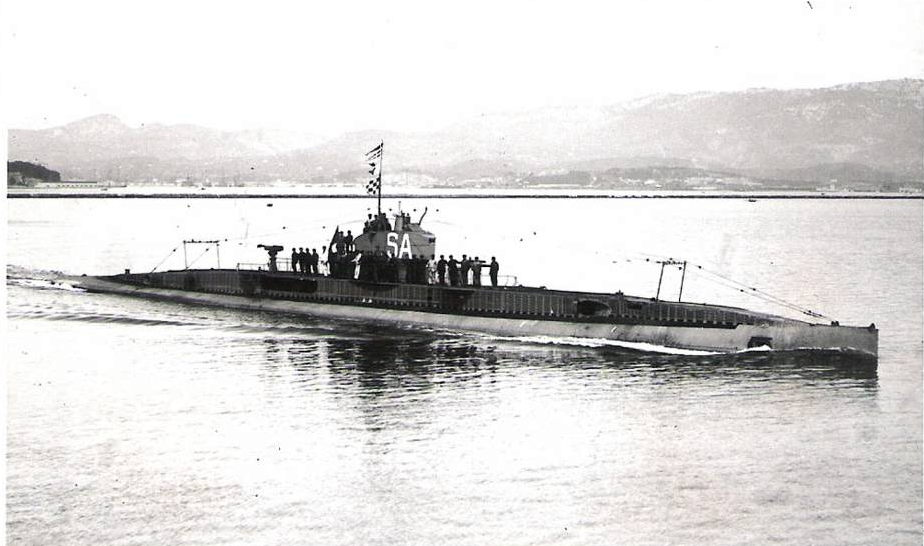
Sané (1916) in 1926, after her 1925 rebuild
