= Dupuy de Lôme =

Dupuy de Lôme may refer to:

- Enrique Dupuy de Lôme (1851–1904), Spanish ambassador to the United States
- Henri Dupuy de Lôme (1816–1885), French naval architect
- French ship Dupuy de Lôme, a list of ships with the name
