= Enmore =

Enmore may refer to:

== Places ==
- Enmore, Guyana
- Enmore, New South Wales, Australia, a suburb of Sydney
  - the Enmore Theatre in that suburb
- Enmore, Somerset, England

== Ships ==
- Enmore (ship), which arrived in Adelaide from London in January 1846 with George Morphett and James Philcox on board
- Enmore (1858), a Bristol built merchant ship
