= Lome (disambiguation) =

Lomé is the capital and largest city of Togo.

Lome may also refer to:

== Places ==
- Lome (Aanaa), a district of Oromia, Ethiopia
- Lome, Idrija, Slovenia

== Other uses ==
- Late Ordovician mass extinction (LOME)
- Lome Fa'atau (born 1975), New Zealand rugby union player

== See also ==
- Dupuy de Lôme (disambiguation)
- Lomé Convention, a trade and aid agreement between the EU the ACP
- Lomé Peace Agreement, a Sierra Leone peace agreement
