= French ship Dupuy de Lôme =

Three ships of the French Navy have borne the name Dupuy de Lôme in honour of Henri Dupuy de Lôme:

- French cruiser Dupuy de Lôme, an armoured cruiser of 1887
- French submarine Dupuy de Lôme, a submarine of 1916
  - Dupuy de Lôme-class submarine
- French ship Dupuy de Lôme (A759), an intelligence ship of 2006
