= List of shipwrecks in May 1860 =

The list of shipwrecks in May 1860 includes ships sunk, foundered, grounded, or otherwise lost during May 1860.

== 1 May ==
List of shipwrecks: 1 May 1860
Ship	State	Description
Argo	United Kingdom	The brig was driven ashore at Pakefield, Suffolk. She was on a voyage from Brouwershaven, Zeeland, Netherlands to South Shields, County Durham.
Auguste	Stralsund	The brig was wrecked on the Longsand, in the North Sea off the coast of Essex, United Kingdom with the loss of all hands. She was on a voyage from Danzig to Gloucester, United Kingdom.
Neptune	United Kingdom	The ship was wrecked on the Barrow of Ballyteigue, off the coast of County Wexford. She was on a voyage from New Orleans, Louisiana, United States to Liverpool.

== 2 May ==
List of shipwrecks: 2 May 1860
Ship	State	Description
Albatross	United Kingdom	The ship was wrecked on the Molasses Reef. She was on a voyage from "Orocas" to London.
Belisaire	France	The lugger ran aground on the Basses Tresses, off the coast of Morbihan and sank. Her crew were rescued. She was on a voyage from Nantes, Loire-Inférieure to Hennebont, Morbihan.
Padova	Austrian Empire	The ship was destroyed by fire near "Sampiere", Sicily. Her crew were rescued. She was on a voyage from Newcastle upon Tyne, Northumberland, United Kingdom to Trieste.
United States	United States	The whaler, a barque, foundered. Her crew were rescued by Moses Wheeler (United States).

== 3 May ==
List of shipwrecks: 3 May 1860
Ship	State	Description
Ann Mills	United Kingdom	The brig was wrecked at Cape Bonavista, Newfoundland, British North America with the loss of two of her ten crew. She was on a voyage from Sunderland, County Durham to Quebec City, Province of Canada, British North America.
Cleveland	United Kingdom	The ship was sighted in the Indian Ocean whilst on a voyage from Madras, India to London. No further trace, presumed foundered with the loss of all hands.
Mathilde	France	The chasse-marée collided with Flanders (Belgium) in the English Channel off Beachy Head, Sussex, United Kingdom. She was taken in tow by Flanders but consequently sank. Her crew were rescued. Mathilde was on a voyage from Nantes, Loire-Inférieure to Dunkirk, Nord.
Vanguard	United Kingdom	The brig was wrecked at Thorpeness, Suffolk. She was on a voyage from Hartlepool, County Durham to London.

== 4 May ==
List of shipwrecks: 4 May 1860
Ship	State	Description
Belvedere	United Kingdom	The schooner was destroyed by fire in the Wood Islands. She was on a voyage from Charlotte, Saint Vincent to Bermuda.
Magenta	United Kingdom	The brig was destroyed by fire at Constantinople, Ottoman Empire. She was on a voyage from Liverpool, Lancashire to Constantinople and the Danube.
Sabrina	Prussia	The ship ran aground near Brouwershaven, Zeeland, Netherlands. She was on a voyage from Wolgast to Brussels, West Flanders, Belgium.
Woodcock	United Kingdom	The ship was abandoned by her fourteen crew. She foundered off Cádiz, Spain on 6 May. She was on a voyage from Beaumaris, Anglesey to Boston, Massachusetts, United States.

== 5 May ==
List of shipwrecks: 5 May 1860
Ship	State	Description
Caroline F. A. Simpson	United States	The schooner was holed by her anchor at Queenstown, County Cork, United Kingdom and was severely damaged.
Libra	Netherlands	The ship was driven ashore and wrecked on Skagen, Denmark. She was on a voyage from Newcastle upon Tyne, Northumberland, United Kingdom to Königsberg, Prussia.

== 6 May ==
List of shipwrecks: 6 May 1860
Ship	State	Description
William Henry	United Kingdom	The snow was lost off the coast of the Kingdom of Hanover between the mouths of the Elbe and Weser. Her eight crew were rescued. She was on a voyage from Sunderland, County Durham to Bremerhaven.

== 7 May ==
List of shipwrecks: 7 May 1860
Ship	State	Description
Guisachan	United Kingdom	The barque ran aground off Dognose Point, County Cork and was damaged. She was refloated.
Switzerland	United States	The ship burned in Apalachicola Bay, Florida.
Warwick	United States	The ship was struck by lightning in the Atlantic Ocean, setting her cargo on fire. She was on a voyage from New Orleans, Louisiana to Havre de Grâce, Seine-Inférieure, France. She was scuttled on arrival at Havre de Grâce on 29 May.

== 8 May ==
List of shipwrecks: 8 May 1860
Ship	State	Description
Eliza Mary	France	The brig was wrecked on the Bringegette Rocks, north west of Alderney, Channel Islands. Her crew were rescued.
Reformer	United Kingdom	The full-rigged ship was wrecked in the Abaco Islands. Her 25 crew survived. She was on a voyage from New York to New Orleans, Louisiana, United States.
Sarah and Emma	United Kingdom	The full-rigged ship foundered in the Atlantic Ocean. Her 28 crew survived. She was on a voyage from Callao, Peru to Queenstown, County Cork.

== 9 May ==
List of shipwrecks: 9 May 1860
Ship	State	Description
Deva	United Kingdom	The full-rigged ship was wrecked at False Point, India. Her 31 crew were rescued. She was on a voyage from Liverpool, Lancashire to Calcutta, India.
Zouave	United Kingdom	The Mersey Flat was driven ashore near Rhyl, Denbighshire.

== 10 May ==
List of shipwrecks: 10 May 1860
Ship	State	Description
George	United Kingdom	The brig was wrecked in Whitsand Bay with the loss of seven of her ten crew. She was on a voyage from Pernambuco, Brazil to Plymouth, Devon.
R. T. Lass	United States	The steamship struck a submerged object and sank in the Mississippi River 50 nautical miles (93 km) downstream of Memphis, Tennessee with the loss of five of her crew. She was on a voyage from New Orleans, Louisiana to Cincinnati, Ohio.

== 11 May ==
List of shipwrecks: 11 May 1860
Ship	State	Description
Calcutta	United Kingdom	The steamship was wrecked on the Arklow Bank, in the Irish Sea off the coast of County Wicklow. All on board were rescued by a tug and the Cahore Lifeboat. She was on her maiden voyage, from Glasgow, Renfrewshire to Calcutta, India.
Citizen	United Kingdom	The steamship ran aground at Dover, Kent. She was on a voyage from Waterford to London. She was refloated and resumed her voyage.
Lombardo	Kingdom of Sardinia	Expedition of the Thousand: The paddle steamer was sunk off Marsala, Sicily by two Royal Sicilian Navy frigates.
Normanby	United Kingdom	The steamship was damaged by fire at Hartlepool, County Durham.
Princilippo	United Kingdom	The schooner was towed into the River Mersey in a derelict condition by the fishing smacks Gipsey Queen and Hawk (both United Kingdom).
Rapide	Belgium	The ship ran aground on the Corton Sand, in the North Sea off the coast of Suffolk, United Kingdom. She was on a voyage from Hull, Yorkshire to Ostend, West Flanders. She was refloated.
Spry	United Kingdom	The brig was driven ashore 2 nautical miles (3.7 km) south of St Bees Lighthouse, Cumberland.

== 12 May ==
List of shipwrecks: 12 May 1860
Ship	State	Description
Acadia	United Kingdom	The barque foundered in the Atlantic Ocean. Her seventeen crew were rescued by the brig Christian (Denmark). Acadia was on a voyage from Demerara, British Guiana to London.
Atlantic	United Kingdom	The steamship ran aground at Alexandria, Egypt. She was refloated and put back to Alexandria.
Balclutha	United Kingdom	The steamship was driven ashore. She was on a voyage from Greenock, Renfrewshire to Melbourne, Victoria. She had been refloated by 14 May and put back to Greenock.
Falcon	United Kingdom	The steamship ran aground on Patterson's Rock, between Sanda Island and Sheep Island, Argyllshire. Her twenty crew and 80 passengers were taken off. She was on a voyage from Glasgow, Renfrewshire to Londonderry. She was refloated and put back to Glasgow.
Le Ruse Cherdonite	France	The ship was driven ashore and wrecked at Castletown, Isle of Man. She was on a voyage from Bordeaux, Gironde to Belfast, County Antrim, United Kingdom.
Nora Creina	United Kingdom	The steam yacht struck the Granes Rock, off Guernsey, Channel Islands and sank. All on board survived. She was on a voyage from Jersey to Guernsey. Nora Creina was refloated on 5 July
Sea Serpent	United Kingdom	The ship was driven ashore and damaged at "Simao Pinto", 15 nautical miles (28 km) south of Pernambuco, Brazil. She was on a voyage from the Cape of Good Hope, Cape Colony to Liverpool. She was refloated and taken in to Paraíba.

== 13 May ==
List of shipwrecks: 13 May 1860
Ship	State	Description
Diana	United Kingdom	The brig was driven ashore and wrecked at Ballycotton, County Cork. Her crew survived. She was on a voyage from Thessaloniki, Greece to Liverpool, Lancashire. Diana was refloated on 7 June and towed in to Queenstown, County Cork.
Julindur	United Kingdom	The ship was sighted in the Indian Ocean whilst on a voyage from South Shields, County Durham to Suez, Egypt. No further trace, presumed foundered with the loss of all hands.
Her Majesty	United Kingdom	The ship was driven ashore at Kurrachee, India. She was refloated.

== 14 May ==
List of shipwrecks: 14 May 1860
Ship	State	Description
Balder	Denmark	The brigantine was driven ashore at Kilmore, Isle of Skye, United Kingdom. She was on a voyage from "Owlga" to Liverpool, Lancashire, United Kingdom.
Bess Grant	United Kingdom	The barque was wrecked on the coast of Sierra Leone. Her fifteen crew survived. She was on a voyage from Sierra Leone to London.
Catteaux Wattel	(United Kingdom of Great Britain and Ireland) New South Wales	The brig was destroyed by fire at Sydney.
Iris	Stettin	The brig was wrecked on Anholt, Denmark. Her crew were rescued. She was on a voyage from Sunderland, County Durham, United Kingdom to Stettin.

== 15 May ==
List of shipwrecks: 15 May 1860
Ship	State	Description
Lilias	United Kingdom	The ship departed from Königsberg, Prussia for London. No further trace, presumed foundered with the loss of all hands.
Sarah	United Kingdom	The barque was wrecked near Santa Catarina Island, Brazil. Her eight crew survived. She was on a voyage from Rio de Janeiro, Brazil to Buenos Aires, Argentina.

== 16 May ==
List of shipwrecks: 16 May 1860
Ship	State	Description
E. W. Greenwood	United Kingdom	The schooner was driven ashore and wrecked in the Magdalen Islands, Nova Scotia, British North America. .
Gentoo	United Kingdom	The barque sank in the South Atlantic. Her sixteen crew were rescued by the full-rigged ship Chene (France). Gentoo was on a voyage from Cardiff, Glamorgan to Galle, Ceylon.
Irlam	United Kingdom	The barque was abandoned off Christiansand, Norway. Her nine crew survived. She was on a voyage from Sunderland, County Durham to Kronstadt, Russia.
Leicester	United Kingdom	The full-rigged ship was wrecked at Rhoscolyn, Anglesey. Her 25 crew were rescued. She was on a voyage from Charleston, South Carolina to Liverpool, Lancashire.

== 17 May ==
List of shipwrecks: 17 May 1860
Ship	State	Description
Elizabeth and Ann	United Kingdom	The schooner was driven ashore in Carskay Bay. She was on a voyage from Liverpool, Lancashire to Königsberg, Prussia. She was refloated and resumed her voyage.
Isère	French Navy	The Loire-class transport ship was wrecked at Amoy, China.
Mountstewart Elphinstone	United Kingdom	The ship was driven ashore at Ambleteuse, Pas-de-Calais, France. She was on a voyage from Moulmein, Burma to Chatham, Kent. She was refloated with assistance from Panther and the tug True Briton (both United Kingdom) and towed in to The Downs.
Orissa	United Kingdom	The steamship was severely damaged by an explosion of firedamp at Southampton, Hampshire. Five of her crew were injured.

== 18 May ==
List of shipwrecks: 18 May 1860
Ship	State	Description
Amazon	United Kingdom	The schooner was wrecked in the Magdalen Islands, Nova Scotia, British North America.

== 19 May ==
List of shipwrecks: 19 May 1860
Ship	State	Description
Annegina	Netherlands	The koff was driven ashore and wrecked on Gotland, Sweden. Her crew were rescued. She was on a voyage from Newcastle upon Tyne, Northumberland, United Kingdom to Saint Petersburg, Russia.
Daring	United Kingdom	The brig was driven ashore on Gotland. She was on a voyage from Swinemünde, Prussia to Riga, Russia. She was refloated and resumed her voyage.
Emanuel	Sweden	The galiot was driven ashore on Gotland. She was on a voyage from Newcastle upon Tyne to Kronstadt, Russia. She was refloated and taken in to Burgsvik.
John Stonard	United Kingdom	The schooner sank at Morecambe, Lancashire. She was on a voyage from Ardrossan, Ayrshire to Morecambe. She was refloated the next day.
Kelloe	United Kingdom	The ship was driven ashore on Bornholm, Denmark. She was refloated on 27 May and taken in to Copenhagen, Denmark.

== 20 May ==
List of shipwrecks: 20 May 1860
Ship	State	Description
Edith	United Kingdom	The ship was driven ashore at Ventava, Courland Governorate. She was on a voyage from Hartlepool, County Durham to Ventspils. She was refloated on 30 May and beached at Domesnes.
Juno	United Kingdom	The ship foundered in the North Sea 40 nautical miles (74 km) off the mouth of the Humber. Her crew survived. She was on a voyage from Newcastle upon Tyne, Northumberland to King's Lynn, Norfolk.
Morden	United Kingdom	The brigantine was wrecked off Grand Bahama Island, Bahamas. She was on a voyage from Havana, Cuba to Boston, Massachusetts, United States.
Oaklands	United Kingdom	The barque was driven ashore and wrecked at the mouth of the Swartkops River, Cape Colony. She was on a voyage from London to Port Elizabeth, Cape Colony.

== 21 May ==
List of shipwrecks: 21 May 1860
Ship	State	Description
Catherine Elizabeth	Netherlands	The ship struck a rock in the Baltic Sea and was damaged. She was taken in to Haapsalu, Russia for repairs.
Ceres	United Kingdom	The steamship ran aground in Gerrans Bay. She was on a voyage from Dublin to London. She was refloated with assistance from the tug Dandy (United Kingdom) and taken in to Falmouth, Cornwall.
Johanna Maria	Norway	The ship was sunk by ice off Hudiksvall, Sweden. Her crew were rescued.
Rover's Bride	United Kingdom	The brig collided with another vessel and was abandoned in the Grand Banks of Newfoundland. Her ten crew were rescued by the steamship Canada (United Kingdom). Rover's Bride was on a voyage from Cádiz, Spain to Newfoundland, British North America.

== 22 May ==
List of shipwrecks: 22 May 1860
Ship	State	Description
Fides	United Kingdom	The ship was wrecked on Kangaroo Island, South Australia. She was on a voyage from London to Adelaide, South Australia.
Malabar	United Kingdom	The steamship was wrecked at Point de Galle, Ceylon. All on board were rescued.
Stromboli	United Kingdom	The steamship struck the pier and was damaged at Havre de Grâce, Seine-Inférieure. She was on a voyage from Liverpool, Lancashire to Havre de Grâce.

== 23 May ==
List of shipwrecks: 23 May 1860
Ship	State	Description
Dobsons	(United Kingdom of Great Britain and Ireland) Victoria	The schooner was wrecked in the Bass Strait.
Dolphin	United Kingdom	The schooner ran aground on the Newcombe Sand, in the North Sea off the coast of Suffolk. She was on a voyage from Rochester, Kent to Middlesbrough, Yorkshire. She was refloated and taken in to Lowestoft, Suffolk in a leaky condition.
Jane and Ellen	(United Kingdom of Great Britain and Ireland) New South Wales	The schooner was wrecked on Babel Island, Tasmania.
Launceston	(United Kingdom of Great Britain and Ireland) Tasmania	The schooner was wrecked in the Bass Strait.
Queen of Trumps	Spain	The sloop was driven ashore at Fishguard, Pembrokeshire, United Kingdom. Her crew were rescued. She was on a voyage from Fishguard to Aberavon, Glamorgan United Kingdom. She had become a wreck by 30 May.
Paxton	United Kingdom	The ship ran aground on the Indian Rocks, off Pictou Island, Nova Scotia, British North America. She was on a voyage from Halifax, Nova Scotia to Pugwash, Nova Scotia. She was refloated on 25 May with assistance from the steamship Lord Seaforth ( (United Kingdom of Great Britain and Ireland) ) British North America and towed in to Pugwash.

== 24 May ==
List of shipwrecks: 24 May 1860
Ship	State	Description
Cronstadt	Russia	The steamship was driven ashore at Fredrikshavn, Denmark. She was on a voyage from Hull, Yorkshire, United Kingdom to Kronstadt.
Holyrood	United Kingdom	The steamship ran aground on the South Pampus, off the coast of Zeeland, Netherlands. She was refloated.
Star	United Kingdom	The brig departed from North Shields, County Durham for a Dutch port. No further trace, presumed foundered with the loss of all hands.

== 25 May ==
List of shipwrecks: 25 May 1860
Ship	State	Description
Adelphi	United Kingdom	The brig ran aground on the Goodwin Sands, Kent. She was on a voyage from South Shields, County Durham to Naples, Kingdom of the Two Sicilies. She was refloated and taken to the North Foreland.
Agile	United Kingdom	The ship ran aground on The Shingles, off The Needles, Isle of Wight. She was on a voyage from Ipswich, Suffolk to Dartmouth, Devon. She was refloated and taken in to Cowes, Isle of Wight in a leaky condition.
Arbutus	United Kingdom	The steamship struck rocks off the Mull of Galloway, Wigtownshire and was holed. She consequently put in to Morecambe, Lancashire the next day in a waterlogged condition.
Vivid	United Kingdom	The ship was driven ashore near Walmer Castle, Kent. She was on a voyage from Middlesbrough, Yorkshire to Trieste. She was refloated.

== 26 May ==
List of shipwrecks: 26 May 1860
Ship	State	Description
Frances and Mary	United Kingdom	The ship struck a rock and sank at Brora, Sutherland. She was on a voyage from South Shields, County Durham to Brora.
Heber	United Kingdom	The ship ran aground on the Oxey Spit, off the Isle of Wight. She was on a voyage from South Shields to Brixham, Devon. She was refloated on 4 June.
Idas	United Kingdom	The brig departed from Hartlepool, County Durham for Newhaven, Sussex. No further trace, presumed foundered with the loss of all hands.
Light and Sign	United Kingdom	The ship was driven ashore in Stokes Bay, Suffolk. She was on a voyage from Sunderland, County Durham to London. She was refloated on 5 June and taken in to Southwold, Suffolk.
Louise Desirée	France	The schooner was driven ashore near Bolderāja, Russia. She was on a voyage from Sunderland to Bolderāja. She was refloated on 29 May and taken in to Bolderāja.
Pike	United Kingdom	The brig ran aground on the Newcombe Sand, in the North Sea off the coast of Suffolk. She was refloated and resumed her voyage.
Sealark	United Kingdom	The sloop sprang a leak and put in to Dover, Kent, where she sank the next day. She was on a voyage from London to Bridport, Dorset and/or Bridgwater, Somerset.
Triumph	United Kingdom	The brig was wrecked on the Woolseners, in the English Channel off the coast of Hampshire. Her crew were rescued by the Coast Guard. She was on a voyage from Guernsey, Channel Islands to London.

== 27 May ==
List of shipwrecks: 27 May 1860
Ship	State	Description
Adelaide, and Seaflower	United Kingdom	The full-rigged ship Adelaide ran into the barque Seaflower then collided with the schooner Rose (United Kingdom) and was beached in the Sloyne. She was on a voyage from New York, United States to Liverpool, Lancashire. She was refloated on 30 May and taken in to Liverpool. Seaflower sank. She was on a voyage from Liverpool to Africa. She was raised on 1 June and beached at Eastham, Cheshire.
Belvidere	United Kingdom	The barque was driven ashore and wrecked on Gotland, Sweden. Her eleven crew were rescued. She was on a voyage from Newcastle upon Tyne, Northumberland to a Baltic port.
Brazilian	United Kingdom	The brig was abandoned 115 nautical miles (213 km) south west of the Isles of Scilly. Her nine crew were rescued by City of Manchester (United Kingdom). She was on a voyage from "Pomaron" to Liverpool.
Carnarvon	United Kingdom	The ship was driven ashore and damaged at Beaumaris, Anglesey. She was on a voyage from Runcorn, Cheshire to Cork.
Content	United Kingdom	The schooner was driven into Young Sam (United States) and damaged at Liverpool.
Dublin Lass	United Kingdom	The ship ran aground on the Herd Sand, in the North Sea off the coast of County Durham. She was refloated with the assistance of several steamships.
Elmer	United Kingdom	The fishing smack was driven ashore and wrecked on Ameland, Friesland, Netherlands with the loss of four of her nine crew. Survivors were rescued by a lifeboat.
Elise	France	The schooner was driven against the quayside and severely damaged at Liverpool.
Emily Gardner	United Kingdom	The full-rigged ship was driven ashore at Garston, Lancashire. She was on a voyage from Belize City, British Honduras to Liverpool.
Favourite	United Kingdom	The fishing smack was wrecked in the Vlie with the loss of all hands. She was then driven ashore on Vlieland, Frisland, Netherlands. She later broke up.
Fleur de Marie	France	The schooner ran aground on the Herd Sand. She floated off the next day and came ashore. Her crew were rescued. Fleur de Marie was refloated on 2 June and taken in to South Shields, County Durham.
Gannet	United Kingdom	The steamboat was severely damaged by fire on the River Thames.
Henry Norway	United Kingdom	The brig was driven ashore at Bristol, Gloucestershire.
Houston	United States	The ship was driven onto the Burbo Bank, in Liverpool Bay. She was on a voyage from Liverpool to Galveston, Texas. She was refloated and taken in to Liverpool.
J. C. Hall	United Kingdom	The ship was driven against the quayside and damaged at Liverpool.
J. M. Wood	United Kingdom	The ship was driven against the quayside and severely damaged at Waterloo, Lancashire.
Josiah L. Hale	United Kingdom	The full-rigged ship was driven against the quayside and ran aground at Liverpool.
King William IV	United Kingdom	The schooner was discovered in a waterlogged condition in Liverpool Bay. She was taken in to Liverpool.
Mary Gardner	United Kingdom	The ship was driven ashore at Garston Point, Lancashire.
Nimrod	United Kingdom	The ship was driven ashore at Whitby, Yorkshire.
Ocean Queen	United Kingdom	The ship was driven ashore at Fleetwood, Lancashire. She was on a voyage from Maryport, Cumberland to Liverpool.
Pearl	United Kingdom	The schooner was driven against the quayside and severely damaged at Liverpool.
Raymon	United Kingdom	The ship was driven ashore and damaged at "Searspool", Lancashire. She was on a voyage from Apalachicola, Florida, United States to London.
R. M. Mills	United States	The full-rigged ship was abandoned in the Bay of Biscay. Her crew were rescued. She was on a voyage from Ardrossan, AyrshireUnited Kingdom to Genoa, Kingdom of Sardinia. She was discovered two days later by Scotia (United States) which put three crew on board. R. M. Mills was later taken in tow by a tug. and passed The Downs for London on 4 June.
Rockaway	United States	The full-rigged ship was driven against the quayside and damaged at Liverpool. She was on a voyage from Liverpool to New York.
Sealark	United Kingdom	The ship was driven ashore at Southend, Essex. Her crew were rescued.
Seraph	United Kingdom	The Mersey Flat was severely damaged by fire at Birkenhead.
Tiger	United Kingdom	The steamship was holed at Birkenhead, Cheshire.
Utility	United Kingdom	The brigantine was driven ashore and wrecked on Vlieland with the loss of five of her six crew. She was on a voyage from Newcastle upon Tyne, Northumberland to the Nieuw Diep.
Westbourne	United Kingdom	The ship was driven ashore and sank at Garston Point. She was on a voyage from Belize City, British Honduras to Liverpool. Westbourne was refloated on 31 May and taken in to Liverpool.
Western Chief	United Kingdom	The ship was driven onto the Devil's Bank, in Liverpool Bay. She was on a voyage from Liverpool to Melbourne, Victoria. She was refloated.
West Point	United Kingdom	The ship was driven against the quayside and severely damaged at Liverpool.
Windsor	United Kingdom	A ship drove into Windsor, which was driven into another vessel and damaged at Liverpool.
Young Sam	United States	The ship was driven against the quayside and damaged at Liverpool. She then drove ashore at Seacombe, Cheshire. She was on a voyage from Liverpool to Boston, Massachusetts. She was refloated, but drove ran aground at the Prince's Landing Stage. Subsequently refloated and placed under repair.

== 28 May ==
List of shipwrecks: 28 May 1860
Ship	State	Description
Abeona	United Kingdom	The ship was driven ashore at Redcar, Yorkshire.
Adeona	United Kingdom	The schooner was driven ashore and wrecked south of Seaton, County Durham. Her crew were rescued She was on a voyage from Colchester, Essex to Sunderland, County Durham.
Æolus	United Kingdom	The brig sprang a leak and was beached at Horsey, Norfolk, where she was wrecked with the loss of five of her seven crew. She was on a voyage from North Shields, County Durham to London.
Agnes	United Kingdom	The ship was driven ashore at Redcar. Her crew were rescued. She was on a voyage from Lowestoft, Suffolk to Newcastle upon Tyne, Northumberland. She was refloated on 31 May and towed in to West Hartlepool, County Durham.
Albion	United Kingdom	The sloop was wrecked on the Doom Bar. Her three crew were rescued.
Alert	United Kingdom	The schooner was driven ashore 3 nautical miles (5.6 km) north of Whitby, Yorkshire. Her crew were rescued.
Alfred	France	The ship was driven ashore near Redcar. Her crew were rescued. She was on a voyage from Paimpol, Côtes-du-Nord to Blyth, Northumberland.
Ann	United Kingdom	The ship was driven ashore near Redcar. Her crew were rescued. She was on a voyage from Havre de Grâce, Seine-Inférieure, France to South Shields, County Durham.
Ant	United Kingdom	The ship was driven ashore at Redcar. Her crew were rescued. She was on a voyage from Sheerness, Kent to Middlesbrough, Yorkshire.
Beeswing	United Kingdom	The schooner was driven ashore at Port Mulgrave, Yorkshire. She was refloated on 30 May and taken in to Whitby in a severely damaged condition.
Benjamin Boyd	United Kingdom	The ship capsized in a squall at Cádiz, Spain.
Betsey	United Kingdom	The ship was driven ashore at Redcar. Her crew were rescued. She was on a voyage from Great Yarmouth, Norfolk to Stockton-on-Tees, County Durham.
Boxer	United Kingdom	The ship was driven ashore near Redcar. Her crew were rescued.
Callao	United Kingdom	The schooner foundered in the North Sea 15 nautical miles (28 km) off the Dudgeon Lightship ( Trinity House) with the loss of all but her captain. He was rescued by the smack Ariel (United Kingdom). Callao was on a voyage from the River Tyne to Exeter, Devon.
Celerity	United Kingdom	The fishing boat foundered off the Dutch coast with the loss of all hands.
Charles Wesley	United Kingdom	The yawl was lost. Her five crew were rescued by the Whitby Lifeboat.
Charter	United Kingdom	The ship was driven ashore south of Seaton.
Children's Adventure	United Kingdom	The fishing boat foundered off the Dutch coast with the loss of all hnds.
Cornelius	United Kingdom	The ship was driven ashore south of Seaton.
Corra Linn	United Kingdom	The ship was driven ashore at Redcar with the loss of all hands. She was on a voyage from London to Stockton-on-Tees.
Corsair	United Kingdom	The ship foundered off Vlieland, Friesland, Netherlands. Her crew were rescued.
Dzgolen	Russia	The brig was driven ashore on Ameland, Friesland. Her crew were rescued by a lifeboat. She was on a voyage from Helsinki, Grand Duchy of Finland to Cádiz.
Echo	United Kingdom	The Thames barge was driven ashore at Harwich, Essex.
Edith	United Kingdom	The brig was driven ashore on Saaremaa, Russia. Her nine crew survived. She was on a voyage from Hartlepool, County Durham to Kronstadt, Russia.
Esther Ann	United Kingdom	The ship was driven ashore and damaged at Morecambe, Lancashire. Her crew survived.
Ferdinand	United Kingdom	The coal hulk was driven ashore in Table Bay.
Flying Horse	United Kingdom	The Thames barge was driven ashore at Harwich. She was later refloated.
Gem	United Kingdom	The brig was wrecked on Scroby Sands, Norfolk with the loss of all seven crew. She was on a voyage from Newcastle upon Tyne to Exmouth, Devon.
George and Elizabeth	United Kingdom	The brig was driven ashore at Redcar. Her crew were rescued. She was on a voyage from Bruges, West Flanders, Belgium to Sunderland, County Durham. She was refloated on 1 June and taken in to Sunderland in a severely damaged condition.
Gipsy	United Kingdom	The ship was driven ashore at King's Lynn, Norfolk. She was on a voyage from Seaham, County Durham to King's Lynn. She was refloated and taken in to King's Lynn in a severely leaky condition.
Good Intent	United Kingdom	The ship was run ashore at Kessingland, Suffolk. Her crew were rescued.
Guard	United Kingdom	The ship was driven ashore at Redcar.
Hannah	United Kingdom	The ship foundered in the North Sea 9 nautical miles (17 km) off Kessingland. Her six crew were rescued by the fishing boat Fanny (United Kingdom). Hannah was on a voyage from Middlesbrough to a Baltic port.
Jane and Marie	United Kingdom	The ship was driven ashore near Redcar. Her crew were rescued. She was on a voyage from Ramsgate, Kent to West Hartlepool, County Durham.
John	United Kingdom	The schooner collided with Mary Muncaster (United Kingdom) and foundered in the North Sea off the coast of Norfolk with the loss of two of the five people on board. Survivors were rescued by Mary Muncaster. John was on a voyage from Warkworth, Northumberland to Harfleur, Seine-Inférieure.
John Stonard	United Kingdom	The ship sank and capsized at Morecambe. Her four crew were rescued.
Liberty	United Kingdom	The ship was driven ashore at Redcar. Her crew were rescued. She was on a voyage from London to Hartlepool. She was later refloated and towed in the Hartlepool.
Lord Dacre	United Kingdom	The ship ran aground on the Brand Sand, in the North Sea off the mouth of the River Tees. She was on a voyage from Shoreham-by-Sea, Sussex to the River Tees. She was refloated and taken in to the River Tees in a leaky condition.
Louise	France	The schooner was abandoned in the North Sea. Her crew were rescued by Concord (United Kingdom). Louise was on a voyage from Saint-Valery-sur-Somme, Somme to Sunderland.
Maria	United Kingdom	The schooner was abandoned off Winterton-on-Sea, Norfolk and subsequently driven ashore and wrecked at Horsey. She was on a voyage from Great Yarmouth to South Shields. She was refloated on 31 May and taken in to Great Yarmouth in a derelict condition.
Matilda	United Kingdom	The brig was wrecked on the Gunfleet Sand, in the North Sea off the coast of Essex. Her seven crew were rescued by Joanna (United Kingdom). Matilda was on a voyage from Sunderland to Rochester, Kent.
Mona's Isle	United Kingdom	The ship was driven ashore at Morecambe. Her crew survived.
Percy	United Kingdom	The ship was driven ashore at Redcar. Her crew were rescued. She was on a voyage from Amble, Northumberland to Dieppe, Seine-Inférieure, France or vice versa. She was refloated on 30 May and towed in to Sunderland.
Peter	Denmark	The schooner was driven ashore on the Essex coast. She was refloated and taken in to Harwich in a leaky condition.
Rapid	United Kingdom	The brig was wrecked at Lowestoft. Her eight crew were rescued by the Lowestoft Lifeboat.
Renske	Netherlands	The full-rigged ship was driven ashore at Redcar. Her crew were rescued. She was on a voyage from Southampton, Hampshire to the River Tees and/or Newcastle upon Tyne.
Robert and Margaret	United Kingdom	The brig was wrecked on the Scroby Sands. Her crew were rescued by Harrison (United Kingdom).
Robert and Mary	United Kingdom	The paddle tug foundered in the North Sea off the coast of County Durham with the loss of all four crew.
Ruby	United Kingdom	The smack was driven ashore and sank at Harwich.
Sadian	United Kingdom	The ship was wrecked at Winterton-on-Sea with the loss of all but one of her crew. She was on a voyage from the River Tyne to London.
Samuel and Maria	United Kingdom	The fishing boat foundered off the Dutch coast with the loss of all hands.
Scotia	United Kingdom	The ship was abandoned off the Holm Sand, in the North Sea off the coast of Suffolk. Her crew were rescued by the Lowestoft Lifeboat. She was on a voyage from Sunderland, County Durham to Calais, France. Scotia was taken in to Lowestoft, Suffolk the next day by the tug Volunteer (United Kingdom).
Sema	Denmark	The ship was driven ashore at Patrington, Yorkshire. She was on a voyage from Fredrikshavn to Grimsby, Lincolnshire, United Kingdom. She was refloated on 30 May and taken in to Grimsby.
Sir William Chaytor	United Kingdom	The ship was driven ashore at Redcar.
Solebay	United Kingdom	The schooner was driven ashore at Port Mulgrave. She was refloated on 2 June and taken in to Whitby.
Southwick	United Kingdom	The ship was driven ashore near Redcar. Her crew were rescued. She was on a voyage from Southwold, Suffolk to Hartlepool.
Sportsman	United Kingdom	The ship was driven ashore and damaged at Morecambe. Her crew survived.
Success	United Kingdom	The brig was driven ashore and wrecked at the Mumbles, Glamorgan. Her crew were rescued by the Swansea Lifeboat. She was on a voyage from Swansea, Glamorgan to London.
Therese	United Kingdom	The steamship was driven ashore at Scheveningen, South Holland. All on board were rescued. She was on a voyage from Glasgow, Renfrewshire to Rotterdam, South Holland. She was refloated on 2 June and taken in to Rotterdam.
Three Brothers	United Kingdom	The ship was driven ashore at Morecambe. Her crew survived.
Thyatira	United Kingdom	The brig was driven ashore 1 nautical mile (1.9 km) north of Staithes, Yorkshire. Her crew were rescued. She was on a voyage from London to West Hartlepool.
Tower	United Kingdom	The ship was driven ashore at Morecambe. Both crew were rescued by the Coast Guard.
Two Brothers	United Kingdom	The sloop was driven ashore near Redcar. Her crew were rescued. She was on a voyage from Happisburgh, Norfolk to Hartlepool.
Useful	United Kingdom	The brig was wrecked on Scroby Sands with the loss of all hands.
Victoria	United Kingdom	The sloop was driven ashore near Redcar. Her crew were rescued. She was on a voyage from Wainfleet, Lincolnshire to Middlesbrough, Yorkshire.
Wilhelmina Rosalie	Hamburg	The ship was driven ashore near Redcar. Her crew were rescued. She was on a voyage from Hamburg to Middlesbrough.
William	United Kingdom	The sloop was driven ashore and sank at Harwich.
Zion	United Kingdom	The ship was driven ashore at Redcar. Her crew were rescued. She was on a voyage from Boulogne, Pas-de-Calais, France to Hartlepool.

== 29 May ==
List of shipwrecks: 29 May 1860
Ship	State	Description
Abraham	Duchy of Holstein	The schooner was abandoned in the North Sea off the coast of Norfolk United Kingdom with the loss of all but one of her crew. She was on a voyage from Christiania, Norway to Bordeaux, Gironde, France.
Allerton Packet	United Kingdom	The brig ran aground on the Gunfleet Sand, in the North Sea off the coast of Essex. She was on a voyage from Middlesbrough, Yorkshire to London. She was refloated and taken in to Harwich, Essex in a leaky condition.
Arctic	United States	During a voyage from Marquette, Michigan, to Portage Entry, Michigan, the 861-ton sidewheel paddle steamer ran aground on the westernmost of the Huron Islands in Lake Superior. During the day, she broke up and sank. All on board – 65 passengers and approximately 35 crew – reached shore and survived. The cattle aboard as cargo also reached shore, where all but two were washed away and lost; the island became known as "Cattle Island' because of the shipwrecked cattle. The steamer Fountain City (United States) picked up the passengers on 31 May, and Fountain City and Sea Bird (United States) later picked up the crew. Arctic was valued at US$30,000.
Arundel	United Kingdom	The brig was wrecked on the Gunfleet Sand, in the North Sea off the coast of Essex.
Blonde	United Kingdom	The ship was driven ashore on Naissaar, Russia. She was on a voyage from Grimsby, Lincolnshire to Kronstadt, Russia. She was later refloated and taken in to Kronstadt, where she arrived on 2 June.
Catharina	Duchy of Holstein	The ship was driven ashore at West Hartlepool, County Durham, United Kingdom.
Catherine	United Kingdom	The ship foundered off Heligoland with the loss of all hands.
Dorothea	Flag unknown	The ship was driven ashore at Egmond aan Zee, North Holland, Netherlands. She was on a voyage from Visby, Sweden to Antwerp, Belgium.
Earl Talbot	United Kingdom	The snow was driven ashore and wrecked at Egmond aan Zee, North Holland, Netherlands with the loss of one of her six crew.
Edgar Atheling	United Kingdom	The East Indiaman, a barque, foundered in the North Sea 45 nautical miles (83 km) north west of Lowestoft, Suffolk. All 24 people on board were rescued by the lugger Recompense and another lugger (both United Kingdom). Edgar Atheling was on a voyage from the River Tyne to Aden.
Express	Norway	The barque was abandoned in the North Sea off the coast of Zeeland, Netherlands. Her crew were rescued by the pilot boat No. 2 (Netherlands). Express was on a voyage from Gothenburg, Sweden to Bordeaux, Gironde, France. She was taken in to the Nieuw Diep on 4 June.
Felicié	France	The schooner was wrecked on the Scheenenbaken, off Brielle, South Holland, Netherlands. Her crew were rescued by the Brielle Lifeboat. She was on a voyage from Blyth, Northumberland, United Kingdom to Montagne, Gironde.
Harburg	United Kingdom	The steamship ran aground in the Vlie and later sank with the loss of two of her nineteen crew. She was on a voyage from Hamburg to London.
Isabella and Sarah	United Kingdom	The ship was abandoned in the North Sea. She was subsequently taken in to Lowestoft, Suffolk.
Jane Green	United Kingdom	The barque was wrecked at Blackhall Rocks, County Durham with the loss of seven of her twelve crew. She was on a voyage from London to Sunderland, County Durham.
Lalla	United Kingdom	The brig was wrecked at Blackhall Rocks. Her eight crew were rescued by rocket apparatus.
Neluz	United Kingdom	The ship was driven ashore and wrecked at Horsey, Norfolk. Three crew were rescued. She was on a voyage from South Shields, County Durham to London.
Netherlands	Netherlands	The brig was driven ashore near Zandvoort, North Holland with the loss of all hands.
Norden	Sweden	The brig foundered off Westkapelle, West Flanders, Belgium with the loss of all but one of her crew. The survivor was rescued by the lugger Antelope (United Kingdom). Norden was on a voyage from Stockholm to Genoa, Kingdom of Sardinia.
Satellite	United Kingdom	The brig was wrecked in the Vlie with the loss of all but one of those on board. She was on a voyage from Newcastle upon Tyne, Northumberland to the Nieuw Diep.
Semalia	Netherlands	The schooner was driven ashore on Texel. Her crew were rescued. She was on a voyage from Sumatra, Netherlands East Indies to London.
Templar	United Kingdom	The brig was driven ashore on Texel, North Holland, Netherlands. Her eleven crew were rescued. She was on a voyage from Sunderland to Amsterdam, North Holland.
Therese	United Kingdom	The steamship was driven ashore near Scheveningen, South Holland, Netherlands. She was on a voyage from Glasgow, Renfrewshire to Rotterdam, South Holland.
Three Brothers	United Kingdom	The sloop collided with a schooner and was abandoned in the North Sea off the coast of Suffolk. She was taken in to Southwold, Suffolk the next day.
Victoria	United Kingdom	The brig was driven ashore at Hartlepool. She was refloated on 5 June and taken in to Hartlepool.
Warlbeck	United States	The ship caught fire at Havre de Grâce, Seine-Inférieure, France and was scuttled.

== 30 May ==
List of shipwrecks: 30 May 1860
Ship	State	Description
Dorothea	Sweden	The barque foundered in the North Sea off Egmond aan Zee, North Holland, Netherlands. Her crew were rescued.
Flora	United Kingdom	The schooner was wrecked on the Rysum Shoals, in the North Sea off the coast of the Kingdom of Hanover. Her six crew were rescued. She was on a voyage from Emden, Kingdom of Hanover to Shoreham-by-Sea, Sussex.
Herald	United Kingdom	The barque was driven ashore north of the mouth of the Oste and was abandoned by her crew. She was refloated on 7 June and taken in to Cuxhaven.
Maria Christina	Netherlands	The ship capsized off Callantsoog, Groningen and was driven ashore and wrecked.
President	United Kingdom	The schooner was wrecked in the Magdalen Islands, Nova Scotia, British North America.
Sarah	United Kingdom	The lugger was taken in to Grimsby, Lincolnshire in a derelict condition.
Terra Nova	Norway	The brig was driven ashore on Callantsoog. She was on a voyage from Christiania to Bordeaux, Gironde, France.
Walker	United Kingdom	The collier, a barque, foundered in the North Sea off Egmond aan Zee with the loss of all hands. She was on a voyage from North Shields, County Durham to Schiedam, South Holland, Netherlands.

== 31 May ==
List of shipwrecks: 31 May 1860
Ship	State	Description
Amicitia	Stralsund	The ship foundered in the North Sea.
Ida	United Kingdom	The ship foundered in the North Sea off the north Norfolk coast.
Johannes	Prussia	The ship was wrecked on Smith's Knowl, in the North Sea off Cromer, Norfolk with the loss of five of her eleven crew. Survivors were rescued by the smack Gihon (United Kingdom). Johannes was on a voyage from Stettin to Paimbœuf, Loire-Inférieure, France.
Lina Christina	Sweden	The schooner was lost in the North Sea 60 nautical miles (110 km) off Spurn Point, Yorkshire, United Kingdom. Her crew were rescued. She was on a voyage from Gävle to Hull, Yorkshire.
Robert James Haines	United Kingdom	The ship ran aground on the Ferrier Sand, in The Wash and sank. Her crew were rescued. She was on a voyage from Memel, Prussia to Wisbech, Cambridgeshire.
Trois Soeurs	France	The ship ran aground on the St Nicholas Rocks, in the Loire and was consequently beached. She was on a voyage from Cardiff, Glamorgan, United Kingdom to Paimbœuf, Loire-Inférieure. She was refloated on 1 June.
Vernal	United Kingdom	The brig was abandoned off Texel, North Holland, Netherlands. Her seven crew were rescued. She was on a voyage from Sunderland, County Durham to the Nieuw Diep.
Zoe	France	The schooner was wrecked on Scroby Sands, Norfolk. Her crew were rescued. She was on a voyage from Dunkirk, Nord to Grimsby, Lincolnshire, United Kingdom.

== Unknown date ==
List of shipwrecks: Unknown date in May 1860
Ship	State	Description
Abraham	Norway	The schooner was abandoned in the North Sea off the coast of Norfolk, United Kingdom. The survivor was rescued by a lugger.
Alexander	United Kingdom	The ship was driven ashore at Caen, Calvados, France. She was on a voyage from an English port to Cherbourg, Seine-Inférieure, France.
C. F. G.	Russia	The schooner sank in the Leezo Rende, off Fredrikshavn, Denmark. The wreck was removed on 26 May.
Comet	United States	The ship was driven ashore on Kent Island, Maryland. She was on a voyage from Baltimore, Maryland to Bermuda. She had been refloated by 25 May with assistance from two tugs.
Ellen	(United Kingdom of Great Britain and Ireland) New Zealand	The schooner left Dunedin, New Zealand, for Auckland, New Zealand, on 25 May, and was not seen again. An upturned hull, sighted between Wellington and Dunedin some time later, was probably the wreckage of Ellen. She was carrying three passengers.
Gulnare	United Kingdom	The ship sprang a leak and foundered in the Indian Ocean. Her crew were rescued by Chaco Mighee ( India).
Hastings	United Kingdom	The ship was abandoned off the coast of Africa. Her crew were rescued by Craigievar (United Kingdom).
H. M. Jenkins	United States	The ship was abandoned in the Atlantic Ocean before 18 May.
Intrepid	United States	The ship was wrecked on the Belvidere Shoal. She was on a voyage from China to New York.
Lubbegrana	Flag unknown	The ship was wrecked near Trelleborg, Sweden.
Luna	United Kingdom	The ship was driven ashore on Hog Island, Virginia, United States. She was on a voyage from Liverpool, Lancashire to Alexandria, Virginia.
Maria	Brazil	The ship was driven ashore north of Maceió. She was on a voyage from Buenos Aires, Argentina to Pernambuco.
Oberon	Duchy of Holstein	The schooner foundered in the North Sea with the loss of all but one of her crew. She was on a voyage from Christiania, Norway to Bordeaux, Gironde, France.
Old England	United Kingdom	The ship was abandoned in the Atlantic Ocean before 24 May.
Prima Donna	United Kingdom	The lugger was abandoned in the North Sea with the loss of seven of her ten crew. Survivors were rescued by a French ship. Prima Donna was taken in to Lowestoft, Suffolk on 25 May.
Ripley	Norway	The brig was abandoned in the Atlantic Ocean before 20 May. She was on a voyage from Falmouth, Cornwall, United Kingdom to Shediac, New Brunswick, British North America.
Shamrock	United Kingdom	The steamship was wrecked on the east coast of China before 25 May.
United States	United States	The whaler, a barque, foundered in the Atlantic Ocean between 28 and 30 May. All 32 people on board were rescued by the full-rigged ship Moses Wheeler (United States).
