= French ship Ville de Nantes =

Ship of the line of the French Navy

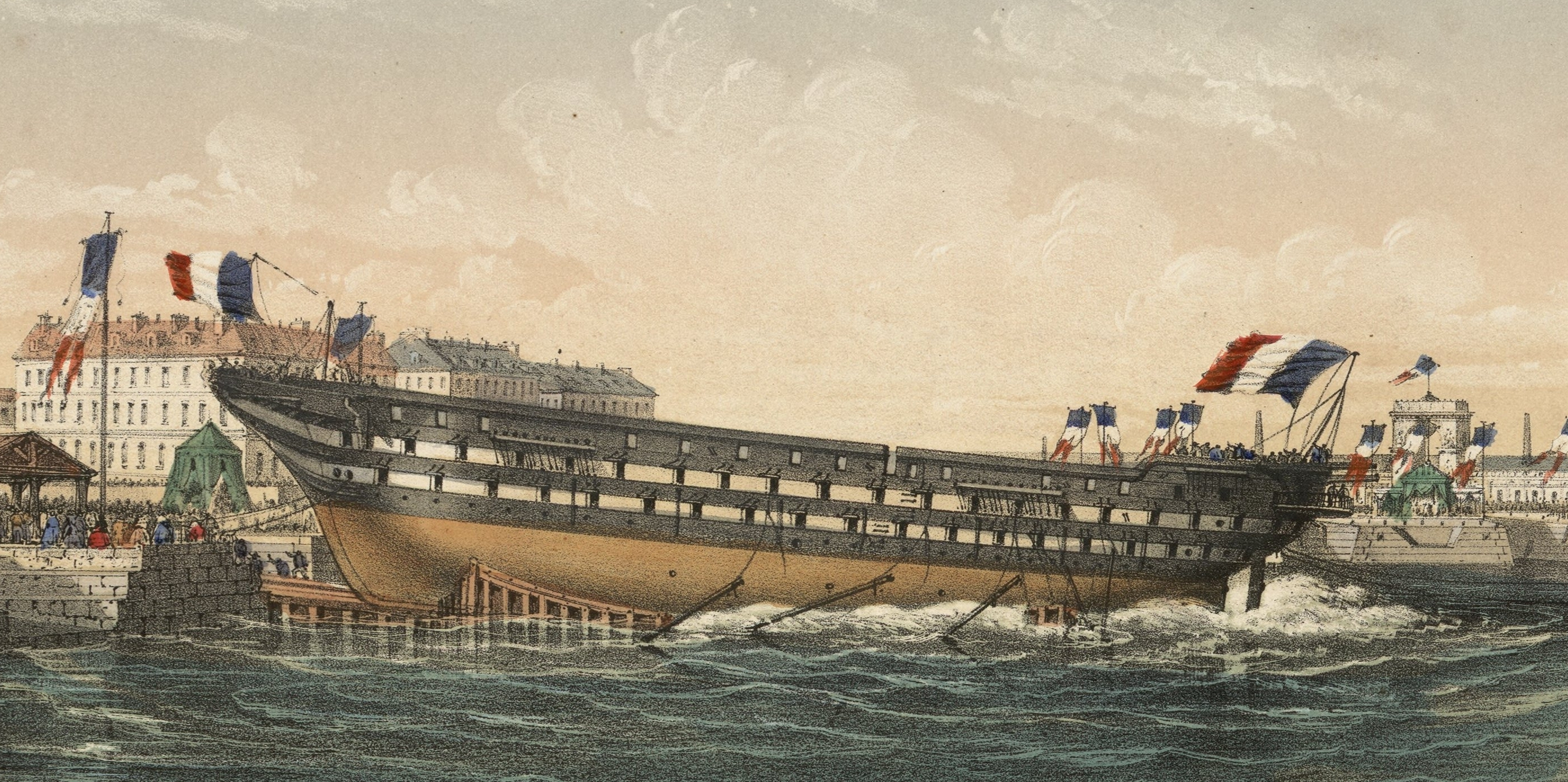
- Launching of Ville de Nantes, by Louis Le Breton

History

Second French Empire
- Name: Ville de Nantes
- Namesake: Nantes
- Ordered: 3 April 1854
- Builder: Arsenal de Cherbourg
- Laid down: 20 June 1854
- Launched: 7 August 1858
- Completed: October 1860
- Commissioned: 25 October 1860
- In service: 1862
- Stricken: 28 November 1872
- Fate: Sold for Scrap, 1887

General characteristics (as of 1863)
- Class & type: Ville de Nantes-class
- Displacement: 5,121 t (5,040 long tons)
- Length: 71.76 m (235 ft 5 in) (waterline)
- Beam: 16.8 m (55 ft 1 in)
- Draught: 8.45 m (27 ft 9 in) (full load)
- Depth of hold: 8.16 m (26 ft 9 in)
- Installed power: 8 boilers; 3,600 PS (2,600 kW)
- Propulsion: 1 screw; 2 steam engines
- Sail plan: Ship rigged
- Speed: 12 knots (22 km/h; 14 mph)
- Complement: 913
- Armament: Lower gundeck: 24 × 30 pdr cannon; 10 × 163 mm (6.4 in) rifled muzzle-loading (RML) guns; Upper gundeck: 24 × 30 pdr cannon; 10 × 223.3 mm (8.8 in) Paixhans guns; Quarterdeck and forecastle: 6 × 163 mm Paixhans guns; 4 × 163 mm RML guns

Ville de Nantes was a second-rank, 90-gun, steam-powered ship of the line built for the French Navy in the 1850s, lead ship of her class of three ships. The ship was in reserve most of her career and served as a prison ship for Communard prisoners in 1871–1872 after the Paris Commune was crushed by the French government. She was sold for scrap in 1887.

== Description ==
The Ville de Nantes-class ships were repeats of the preceding ship of the line Algésiras class and were also designed by naval architect Henri Dupuy de Lôme. They had a length at the waterline of 71.76 metres (235 ft 5 in), a beam of 16.8 metres (55 ft 1 in) and a depth of hold of 8.16 metres (26 ft 9 in). The ships displaced 5,121 tonnes (5,040 long tons) and had a draught of 8.45 metres (27 ft 9 in) at deep load. Their crew numbered 913 officers and ratings.

The Ville de Nantes class were powered by a pair of four-cylinder steam engines that drove the single propeller shaft using steam provided by eight boilers. The engines were rated at 900 nominal horsepower and produced 3,600 indicated horsepower (3,600 PS; 2,700 kW) for a speed of 12 knots (22 km/h; 14 mph). The ships were fitted with three masts and ship rigged with a sail area of 2,730 square metres (29,400 sq ft).

The armament of the Ville de Nantes-class ships consisted of twenty-four 30-pounder (164.7 mm (6.5 in)) smoothbore cannon and ten 163 mm (6.4 in) rifled muzzle-loading (RML) guns on the lower gundeck. On the upper gundeck were twenty-four 30-pounder cannon and ten 223.3 mm (8.8 in) Paixhans guns. On the quarterdeck and forecastle were six 164.7 mm (6.5 in) Paixhans guns and four 163 mm MLR guns.

== Career ==
Ville de Nantes conducted trials in 1860 until, in December, she was used as a transport to ferry troops to Brest. Her engine having broke down, she conducted repairs until July 1861, after which she conducted trials until 1862.

After the Paris Commune, Ville de Nantes was used as a prison hulk in Cherbourg. She was eventually broken up in 1887.
