= French submarine Sané =

Lôme-class submarine

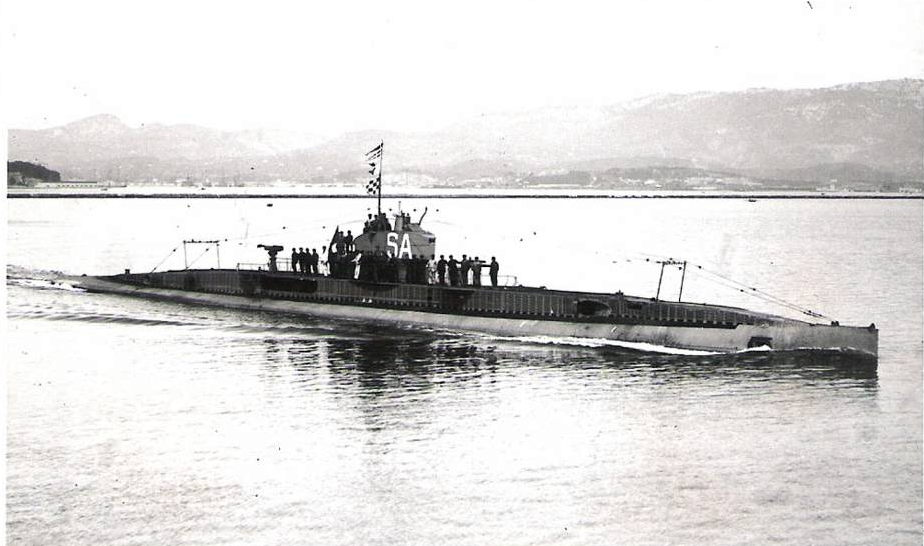
- Sané in 1926

History

France
- Name: Sané
- Namesake: Jacques-Noël Sané
- Ordered: 28 February 1913
- Builder: Arsenal de Toulon
- Laid down: 29 December 1913
- Launched: 27 January 1916
- Commissioned: September 1916
- Stricken: 27 August 1935
- Identification: Budget number: Q106
- Fate: Sold for scrap, 6 August 1938

General characteristics (as built)
- Class & type: Dupuy de Lôme-class submarine
- Displacement: 853 t (840 long tons) (surfaced); 1,291 t (1,271 long tons) (submerged)
- Length: 75 m (246 ft 1 in) (o/a)
- Beam: 6.39 m (21 ft 0 in) (deep)
- Draft: 3.6 m (11 ft 10 in)
- Installed power: 2 × 1,700 PS (1,300 kW; 1,700 bhp) Du Temple boilers; 2 × 820 PS (600 kW; 810 hp) electric motors
- Propulsion: 2 shafts; 2 triple-expansion steam engines
- Speed: 18 knots (33 km/h; 21 mph) (surfaced); 10.9 knots (20.2 km/h; 12.5 mph) (submerged)
- Range: 960 nmi (1,780 km; 1,100 mi) at 14.2 knots (26.3 km/h; 16.3 mph) (surfaced); 135 nmi (250 km; 155 mi) at 5.8 knots (10.7 km/h; 6.7 mph) (submerged)
- Test depth: 50 m (164 ft 1 in)
- Complement: 41
- Armament: 2 × internal bow 450 mm (17.7 in) torpedo tubes; 2 × external stern 450 mm torpedo tubes; 4 × single 450 mm rotating torpedo launchers; 1 or 2 × 75 mm (3 in) deck guns

Sané was one of two Dupuy de Lôme-class submarines built for the French Navy during World War I. She played a minor role in the war and was sold for scrap in 1938.

== Design and description ==
The Dupuy de Lôme class were built to satisfy a requirement for steam-powered, high-speed submarines. They displaced 853 metric tons (840 long tons) surfaced and 1,291 metric tons (1,271 long tons) submerged. The boats had an overall length of 75 meters (246 ft 1 in), a beam of 6.39 meters (21 ft 0 in), and a draft of 4.05 meters (13 ft 3 in). Their crew numbered 41 officers and crewmen.

For surface running, the Dupuy de Lôme-class boats were powered by a pair of three-cylinder vertical triple-expansion steam engines, each driving one propeller shaft using steam provided by two oil-fired du Temple boilers. The engines were designed to produce a total of 4,000 metric horsepower (3,945 bhp; 2,942 kW) to give a speed of 19 knots (35 km/h; 22 mph), but during Sané's sea trials on 20 April 1916, she only reached 18 knots (33 km/h; 21 mph). When submerged each shaft was driven by a 820-metric-horsepower (809 bhp; 603 kW) electric motor. The designed speed underwater was 11.5 knots (21.3 km/h; 13.2 mph), but Sané only reached 11 knots (20 km/h; 13 mph) during her trials. The boat demonstrated a surface endurance of 960 nautical miles (1,780 km; 1,100 mi) at 14.2 knots (26.3 km/h; 16.3 mph) and a submerged endurance of 135 nmi (250 km; 155 mi) at 5.8 knots (10.7 km/h; 6.7 mph).

The Dupuy de Lôme class was armed with a total of eight 450-millimeter (17.7 in) torpedoes. Two internal torpedo tubes in the bow angled outwards three degrees. Four more were located in four external rotating launchers amidships, two on each broadside; one pair each fore and aft of the conning tower that could traverse 143 degrees to the side of the boats. The last pair were in external tubes in the stern aimed outboard at an angle of seven and a half degrees. While the boats were under construction, a 47 mm (1.9 in) anti-aircraft (AA) gun was ordered to be installed in August 1915, but this was ordered to be replaced by a light 75 mm (3 in) gun later that year. Another 75 mm gun was added to the boats in an order dated April 1916. Sané had her forward 75 mm gun replaced by a 65 mm (2.6 in) gun in 1917.

== Construction and career ==
Sané was laid down by the Arsenal de Toulon on 29 December 1913, launched on 27 January 1916 and commissioned in September 1916. She was condemned on 27 August 1935, and sold for scrap on 6 August 1938.

== Bibliography ==
- Couhat, Jean Labayle (1974). French Warships of World War I. London: Ian Allan. ISBN 0-7110-0445-5.
- Garier, Gérard (2002). A l'épreuve de la Grande Guerre. L'odyssée technique et humaine du sous-marin en France (in French). Vol. 3–2. Bourg-en-Bresse, France: Marines édition. ISBN 2-909675-81-5.
- Garier, Gérard (2000). Des Clorinde (1912-1916) aux Diane (1912–1917). L'odyssée technique et humaine du sous-marin en France (in French). Vol. 3–1. Bourg-en-Bresse, France: Marines édition. ISBN 2-909675-54-8.
- Roberts, Stephen S. (2021). French Warships in the Age of Steam 1859–1914: Design, Construction, Careers and Fates. Barnsley, UK: Seaforth Publishing. ISBN 978-1-5267-4533-0.
- Roche, Jean-Michel (2005). Dictionnaire des bâtiments de la flotte de guerre française de Colbert à nos jours 2, 1870 - 2006. Toulon: Roche. ISBN 978-2-9525917-0-6. OCLC 165892922.
- Smigielski, Adam (1985). "France". In Gray, Randal (ed.). Conway's All the World's Fighting Ships 1906–1921. Annapolis, Maryland: Naval Institute Press. pp. 190–220. ISBN 0-87021-907-3.
