= William Duthie (shipbuilder) =

Scottish sea captain and shipbuilder

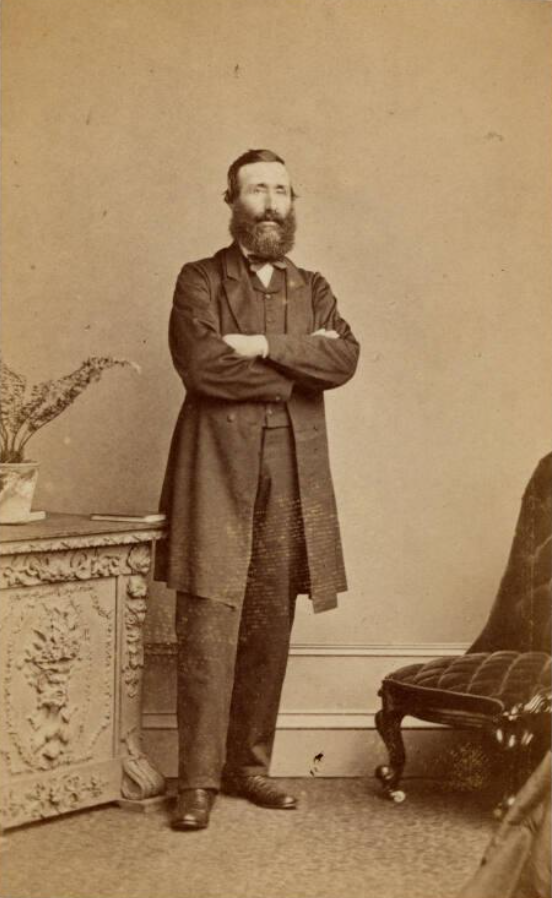
Captain William Duthie, photograph by H. Gordon, c. 1880

William Duthie (1822–1896) of Cairnbulg was a Scottish sea captain and shipbuilder. William was apprenticed to his father, a shipbuilder, before going to sea, rising to the rank of commander, and profiting considerably from the Australian gold rush. He left the seafaring life in 1856 and invested himself in the shipbuilding business; even after his retirement, he continued to own many of the ships he had constructed.

== Life ==
William Duthie was a son of John Duthie, who was for many rears the head of the firm of John Duthie, Sons, & Company. Born in 1822, William Duthie, after leaving school, began life as an apprentice shipbuilder in his father's yard; and, after completing the usual period of service, he went to sea. Passing through the grades he ultimately attained the rank of master, and occupied the position of commander of one of the Australian clippers which brought fame and wealth to Aberdeen. The Australian gold mining craze, which had set in about the same time, afforded Captain Duthie an opportunity of bringing home large quantities of the precious metal, which he deposited in the Bank of England on his arrival in London. According to an obituary in the Aberdeen Journal, "That he was a most able and experienced navigator was shown by the fact that he had a most remarkable immunity from accidents or disaster to the vessels he commanded, and during the whole period of his captaincy an accident involving loss of life and limb to his men was scarcely known." Among his ships were the Rifleman, the Martha Burnie, and Alexander Duthie.

Retiring from the arduous seafaring life in 1856, he began shipbuilding on his own account in that year, and soon established a reputation for the excellence of the workmanship he sent out. He not only built vessels to supply the local demand, but ships for London and Glasgow shipping firms, and these vessels were all distinguished by their fine models and admirable finish. While attending to the orders of his clients he was building a fleet of vessels for himself, and he owned and managed a good many of these.

He retired from the shipbuilding business, but he continued to own a considerable portion of the fleet which he had constructed. After his retirement, Duthie added the Anne Duthie and Cairnbulg to the list of his vessels. Duthie inherited the estate of Cairnbulg, at which he led a life of quiet and retirement.

William Duthie died, at the age of seventy-four, on Sunday 8 November 1896. The death occurred at St Leonards-on-Sea, where he was residing. For some time previous to his death he had been in failing health. He was survived by his wife and three sons and three daughters. The eldest son was John Duthie of Cairnbulg; the second, William, was the well-known artist; and the youngest, J. B. Duthie, was in commercial life in London. His three daughters were married—one to John Brodie, shipowner, of London; another to Dr Anderson, of Stonehaven; and a third to Dr John Inglis, of Hastings.

== Legacy ==
The name of Duthie was long and honourably known in connection with shipbuilding in Aberdeen, and many noble craft were launched from the yard long associated with the firm of John Duthie, Sons, & Company. According to William Duthie's obituary in the Aberdeen Journal, "There was no part of the world into which the vessels had not penetrated, and they carried with credit the name and fame of the Aberdeen builders for the beautiful lines und swiftness of the fleets which they sent forth."
