= Green Shipbuilders =

- Company type: Private
- Industry: Shipbuilding, Boatbuilding, Shipowner
- Founded: 1814
- Defunct: 1873
- Fate: Closed
- Successor: Yard taken over by G.A. Miller
- Headquarters: River Avon & River Frome, UK
- Key people: John Green (founder), Frederick William Green, William Patterson Jr., George A. Miller, J. & W. Peters

Green Shipbuilders were based in Bristol, England, during the 19th century, constructing wooden sailing ships at Wapping on the River Avon from 1814, and later at Tombs' Dock in Dean's Marsh and the Butts on the Frome.

The main site, later known as Green's Dock after the company, was filled in for improvement to the quayside in 1883, and now lies approximately under the Watershed Media Centre on Saint Augustine's Reach.

== History ==
=== Origins ===
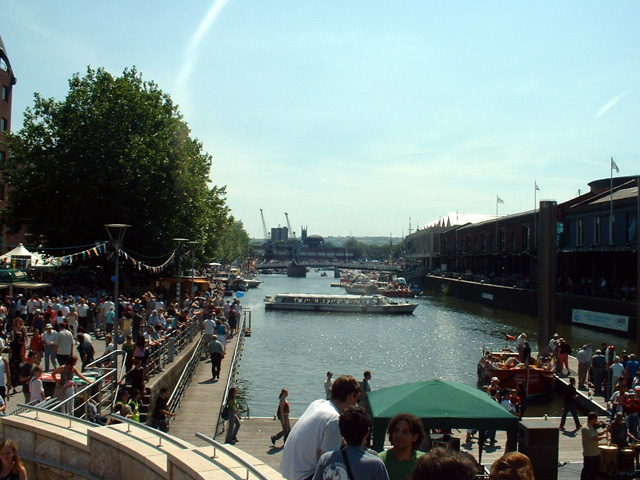
Saint Augustine's Reach in 2004. Green's dock and shipyard would have been to the right hand side.

John Green, a shipwright opened the first yard at Wapping in 1814, having been admitted as a burgess in October 1812. This yard was probably used only for boatbuilding, and in 1815 he leased a second much larger premises at Tombs' dock and building yard at Dean's Marsh from Waring & Fisher.

Building at both yards continued until 1817 when he left Wapping to concentrate the business at Dean's Marsh, likely owning the whole site and drydock by 1821, leading to the dock being renamed Green's Dock. The first vessel identified as built by Green’s was the schooner Hunter in 1826.

=== Shipyard ===
Ships were later built at the head of the drydock and launched through it into the River Frome. The most well known ship built by Green’s was the Clifton, launched in 1835, a large 579 ton East Indiaman, which sailed under the flag of its builder. She was one of several ships launched directly into the dock, which was a hazardous manoeuvre and attracting some attention in the press. John Green's son, Frederick William, joined the business by this time after being admitted a burgess in 1830, and completing an apprenticeship with the shipbuilder Joseph Blannin. He took over the company in about 1835, to be named Frederick William Green or simply F.W. Green, and his father died two years later.

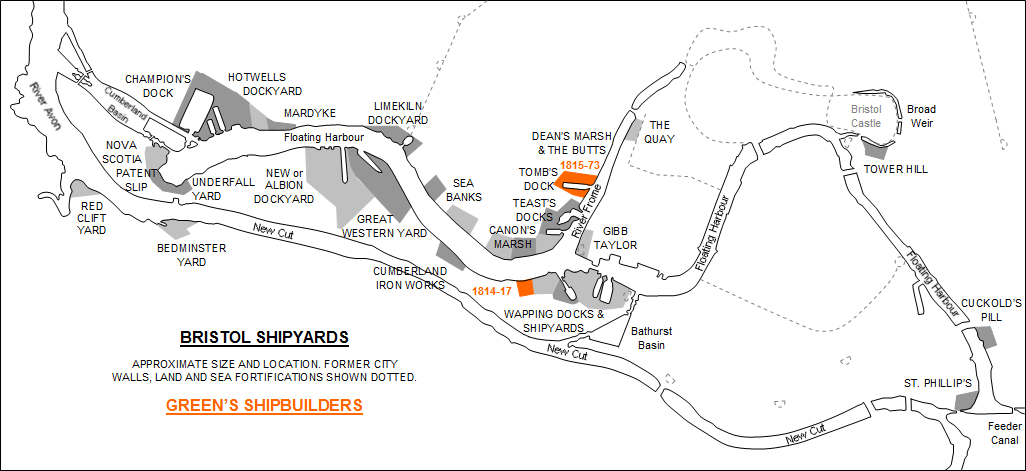
Bristol Shipyards with Green Shipbuilders highlighted

=== Other businesses ===
The Green family were also a prominent shipowner, operating ships in both the West Indies and East Indies trades and owning at least one ship built by them. Several relatives including John’s third son John Irvin Green, a shipwright apprentice in the yard from 1830–37 and an educated mariner, were involved in the business. Sidenham and Horatio Green, likely grandsons of John Green, were also masters in the Green’s fleet.

=== Closure ===
In later years, Green leased part or the whole of his premises to other builders, notably William Patterson Jr. (son of the SS Great Britain's builder) 1869-70, George A. Miller 1871-73 and probably J. & W. Peters during 1862-73. Green closed in 1873, and the dock and shipyard were taken over by George A. Miller, eventually closing in 1883 when it was bought by the Bristol Corporation and filled in to improve the quayside.

== Ships built by Green ==
=== Merchant ===
Known ships built by John Green

- Hunter (1826), 76 t schooner
- Susan (1826), 313 t merchant ship later barque
- The King (1827), 500 t merchant ship (possibly the same vessel as the above)
- Eliza (1829), 291 t schooner later barque
- Prince George (1830), 482 t schooner
- Victor (1833), 338 t schooner later barque

Known ships built by Frederick William Green

- Clifton (1835), 579 t East Indiaman (lengthened in 1844 to 868t)
- Neptune (1844), 132 t brig (later a 187 t barque)
- Henry (1849), 473 t merchant ship
- Enmore (1858), 540 t copper sheathed merchant ship (later a 581 t barque)
