= Enmore (1858) =

British ship

History

United Kingdom
- Name: Enmore
- Owner: Michael Cavan and Company
- Builder: Green Shipbuilders, Bristol
- Launched: 1858

General characteristics
- Class & type: Merchantman
- Sail plan: Full-rigged ship, later barque

The Enmore was a wooden ship-rigged merchantman built by Green Shipbuilders in Bristol in 1858. It is the last known ship built by the shipyard.

She was built for the Barbadian service for Michael Cavan and Company, a Bristolian shipping line, and named after the old established residence of the firm in Enmore, Somerset. Registered in London, she was sheathed in felt and copper. In 1859, whilst under Captain Kennedy of Cavan Bros., the Enmore ran aground and was docked in London for repairs to damage and a new keel. She was subsequently sold when Cavan Bros ceased to operate their own vessels and appointed agents for the Royal Mail Steam Packet Company. Later, she was rated as a 581t barque.
