= SS Malabar (1858) =

History
- Owner: P & O
- Launched: 1858
- Fate: Wrecked 1860

General characteristics
- Type: Steamship
- Tonnage: 917 tons

SS Malabar was a P & O mail steamship of 917 tons launched in 1858 that was wrecked in Point de Galle harbor on 22 May 1860.

The passengers had embarked on Malabar when a gale from the northeast drove the vessel's stern on to a reef. The water began to rise in the ship's stern section and the captain opted to beach the ship in a sandy bay on the opposite side of the harbor. However, the sand turned out to be loose and almost like quicksand, and it was decided to give the order to abandon ship. There was no loss of life.

The passengers included James Bruce, 8th Earl of Elgin and Jean-Baptiste Louis Gros, the British and French plenipotentiaries to China, and The Times journalist Thomas William Bowlby, who later published an account of the wreck.

It was reported that Malabar's cargo included 1,080 boxes of bullion, worth nearly £300,000 and 725 chests of opium.
