= Audacious =

Audacious may refer to:

== Ships ==
- List of ships named Audacious
- HMS Audacious, various ships of the British Royal Navy
- Audacious-class aircraft carrier of the British Royal Navy
- Audacious-class ironclad, Victorian-era battleship class of the British Royal Navy
- SS Audacious (1913), a cargo ship used by the United States during World War II
- USNS Audacious (T-AGOS-11), a Stalwart-class Modified Tactical Auxiliary General Ocean Surveillance Ship of the United States Navy

== Other ==
- Audacious (software), open-source media player
- Audacious, 2016 album by Cupcakke

== See also ==
- Audacity (disambiguation)
- Audacieux
