= François-Edmond Pâris =

French admiral

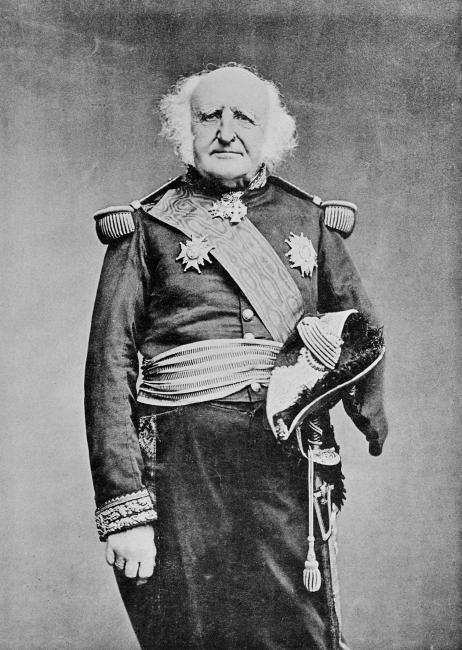
- Photograph by Alphonse Liébert
- Born: 2 March 1806; Paris, France
- Died: 8 April 1893 (aged 87); Paris, France
- Occupation: admiral
- Known for: naval engineering (steam)
- Notable work: Musée national de la Marine

François-Edmond Pâris (6 March 1806 in Paris – 8 April 1893 in Paris) was a French admiral, notable for his contribution to naval engineering during the rise of the steam, for his books, and for his role in organising the Musée national de la Marine.

== Career ==
Pâris joined the Navy in 1820, and studied at the Naval Academy in Brest. Promoted to ensign in 1826, he served under Dumont d'Urville and took part in the famous circumnavigation of the corvette Astrolabe until 1829; on her quest to find traces of the ill fated expedition of La Pérousse which vanished in 1788. He then took part in another scientific expedition around the world, aboard the Favorite, under Cyrille Pierre Théodore Laplace until 1832.

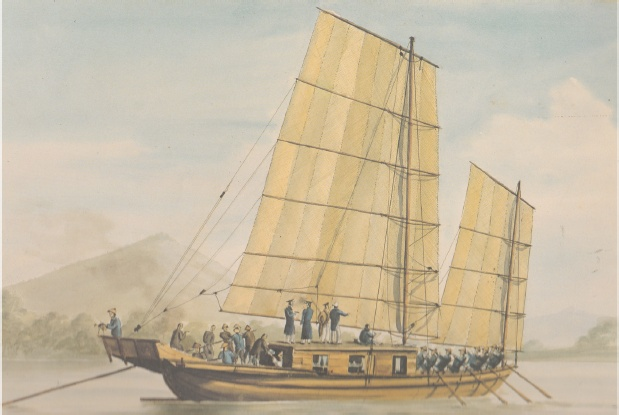
Pâris on a journey from Macao to Canton in 1832, he is sitting on the deck drawing with a board on his knees, while three fellow naval officers and Laplace, stand nearby

Promoted to lieutenant in 1832, Pâris was sent to England to study the naval use of steam engine the next year. After this mission, he captained the Castor from 1834 to 1836.

In 1837, he was attached to the Artémise again under Laplace for a third exploration cruise around the world, during this period he lost part of his left arm in an unfortunate accident while visiting a foundry in Pondicherry. This voyage lasted until 1840, during which he gained his navigator papers.

These experiences abroad provided him with the material of his Essai sur la construction navale des peuples extraeuropéens.

He was promoted to captain and embarked on several short sea expeditions; however, he was mostly employed curating naval maps and plans. In 1843, he received command of Infernal. From 1844, he captained the Archimède, achieving the rank of captain in 1846. He then commanded the Comte d’Eu until 1847, the Gomer in 1848, and Orénoque in 1850, and the Fleurus in 1854. During the Crimean War, Pâris came in charge of the naval division of Dniepr after the Battle of Kinburn.

He was promoted to commander in 1856, and he took command of Audacieuse.

In 1858, Pâris was promoted to rear admiral. From 1860 to 1861, he led the 2nd division of the fleet, with his flag on Algésiras.

In 1863, he became a member of the French Academy of Sciences in recognition of his contributions to geography.

In 1864, Pâris was promoted to vice-admiral, and headed the naval archives department until his retirement in 1871. He was then put in charge of the Musée national de la Marine the old naval museum of the Louvre, which became the Paris National Maritime Museum to which he greatly contributed by organising the collections and acquiring new items. He gifted the museum his extensive collections of drawings, engravings, and notes made throughout his naval life. He is an acknowledged founding father of modern maritime ethnography.

== Works ==
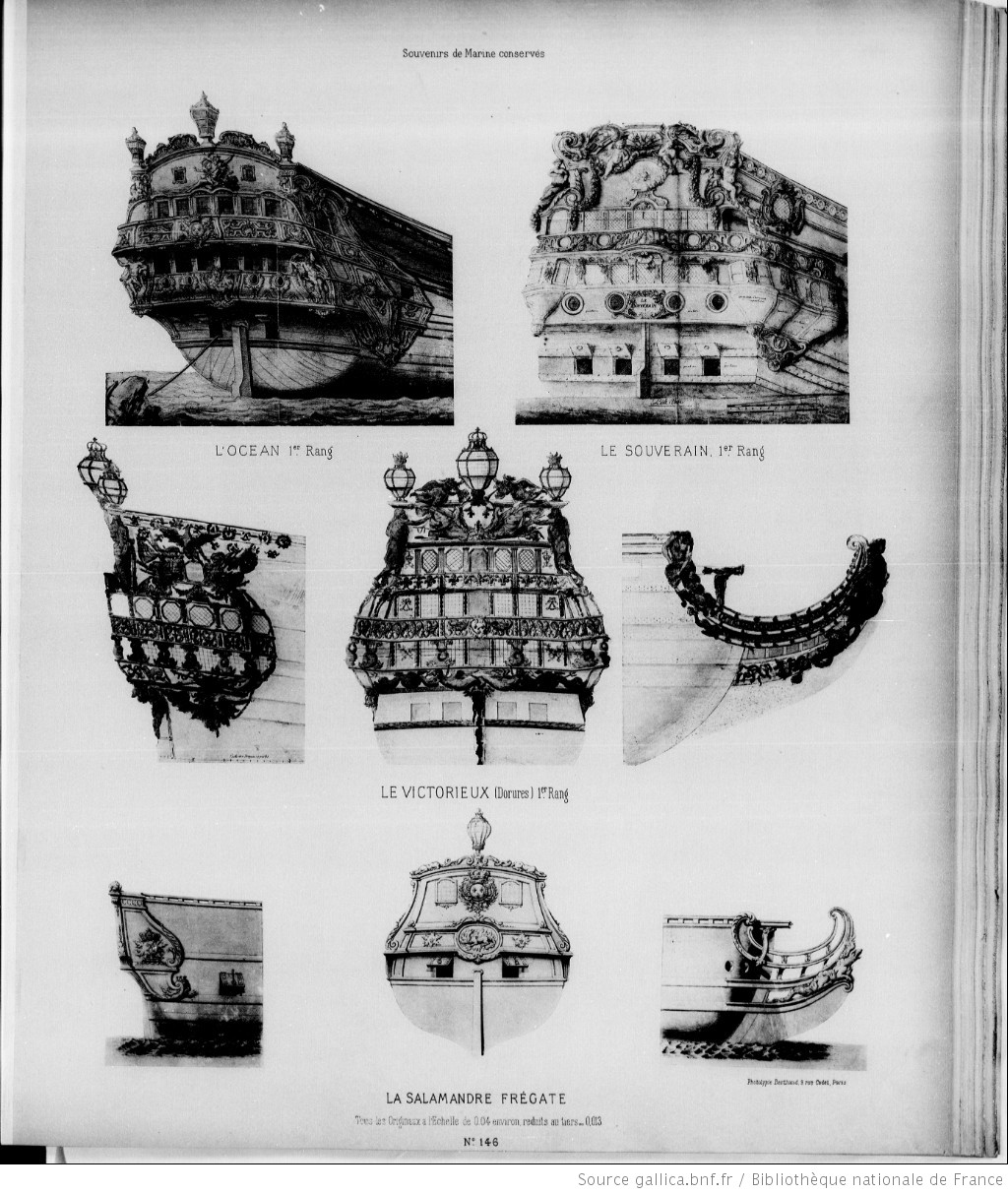
A plate from Souvenirs de marine conservés

Most notable works:

- Essai sur la construction navale des peuples extra-européens ou Collection des navires et pirogues construits par les habitants de l'Asie, de la Malaisie, du Grand Océan et de l'Amérique dessinés et mesurés pendant les voyages autour du monde de "l'Astrolabe", "la Favorite" et "l'Artémise".

Arthus Bertrand, Paris, 1841. Folio, 160 pp, ill., 132 plates.

- Souvenirs de marine conservés, ou Collection de plans de navires de guerre et de commerce et de bateaux divers de tous les pays tracés par les constructeurs ou marins ... recueillis et publiés par l'amiral Pâris ... Album.

Paris, 1879. Folio.

== Tribute ==
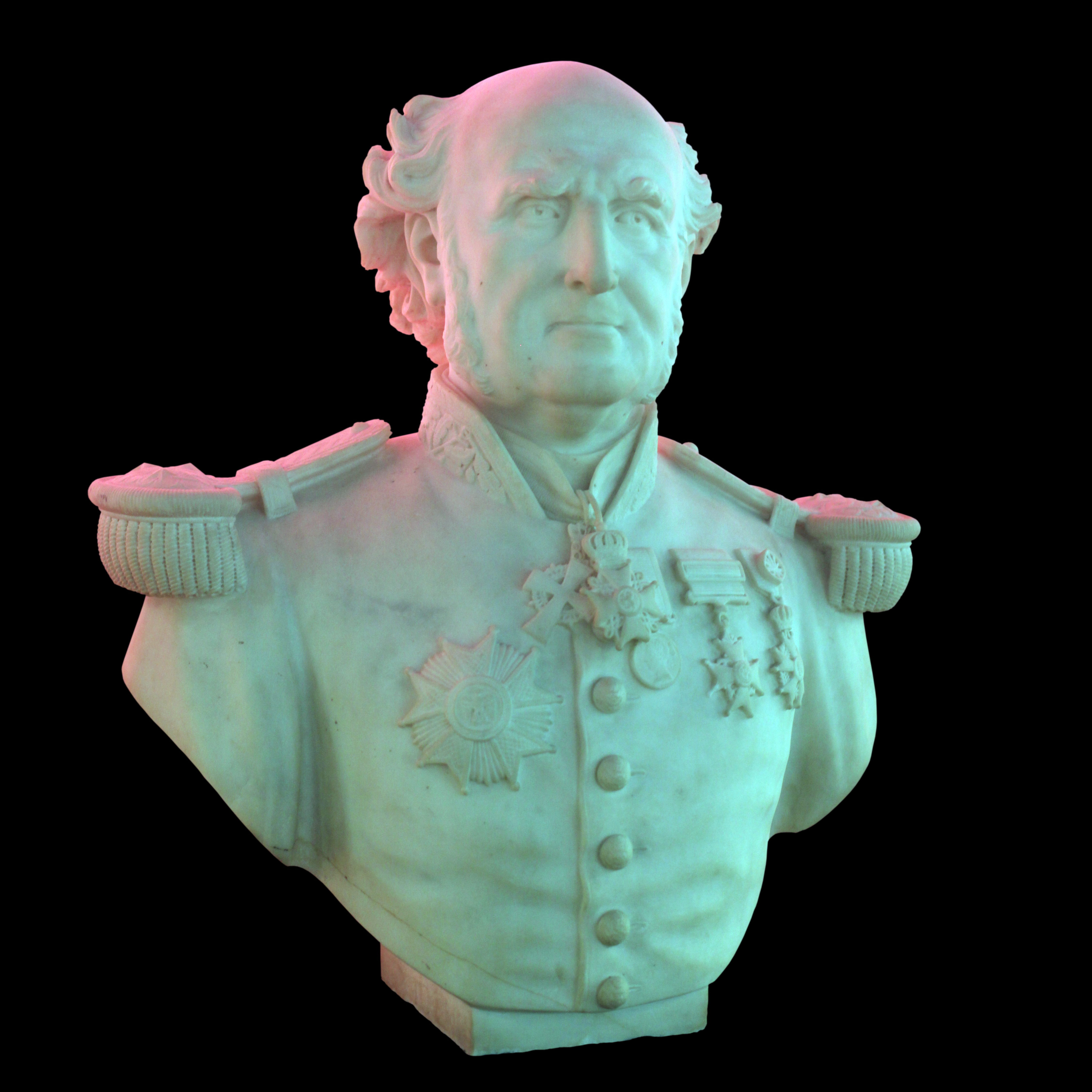
Bust of Pâris by Alexandre-Joseph Oliva, on display at the Musée national de la Marine in Paris.

From 10 March 2010 to 19 September 2010, an exhibition was held in the National maritime museum in Paris, showing the work of Paris in preserving artifacts of the maritime cultures of the world by documenting and designing models. Named "All the boats of the world ", the exhibition conceived as a round-the-world journey, and allowed us to discover a wide variety of peoples, seas and rivers, and to get to know both their boats and their culture.

== Honours ==
- Kingdom of France: Knight of the Legion of Honour, 1833; Officer, 1839; Commander, 1855; Grand Cross, 1880
- Sweden-Norway: Commander Grand Cross of the Order of the Sword, 1 December 1881

== Sources and references ==
- PARIS François Edmond, amiral (1806-1893)
- Nautical Publications of Amiral François Edmond Paris [1806-1893]:
- Traditional Boats of Macao by François Edmond Paris, foreword: Ivo Carneiro de Sousa
