= French frigate Flore (1806) =

Coordinates: 45.219°N 12.348°E

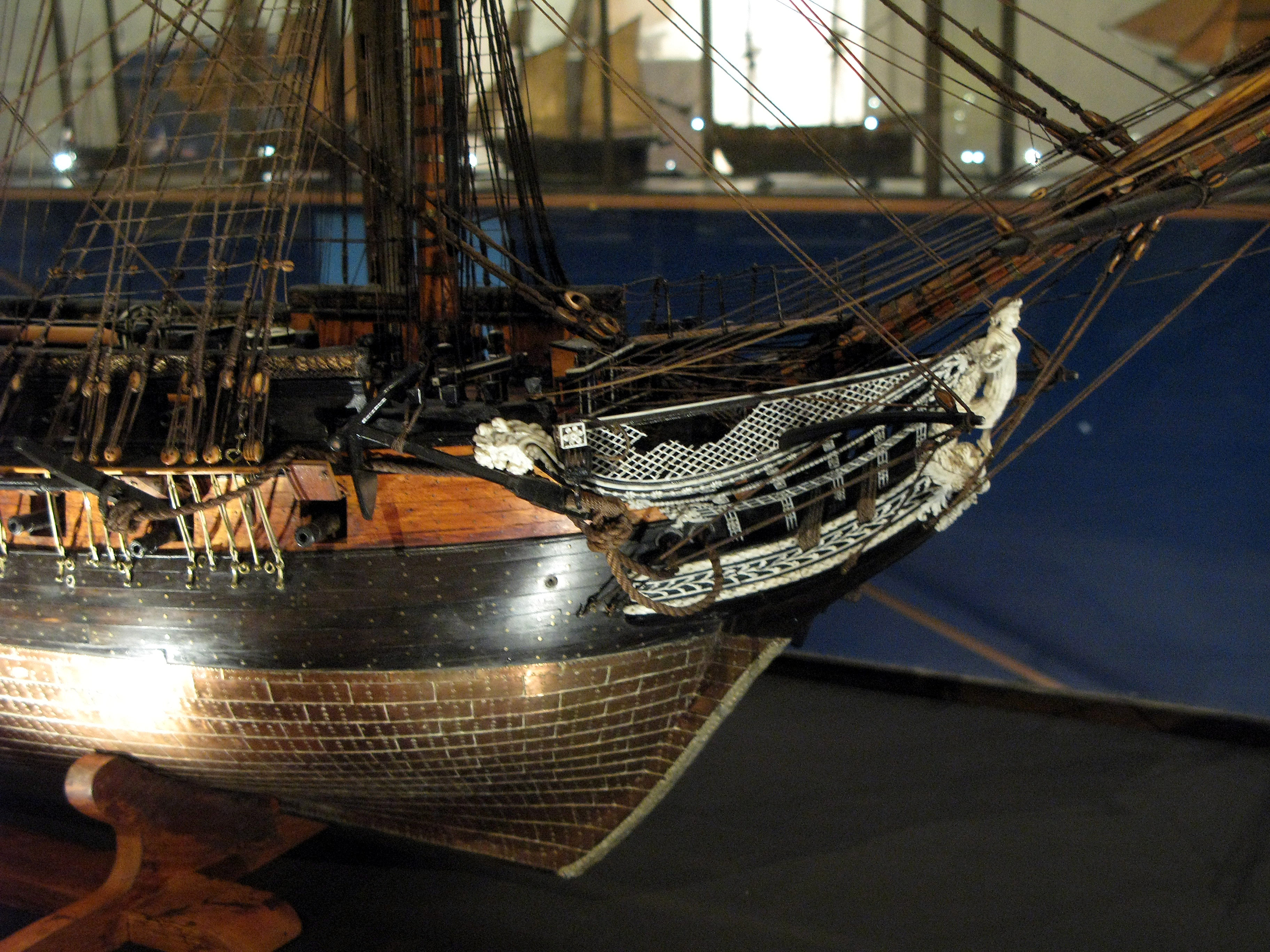
- A 1/48 scale model of Flore on display at the Musée national de la Marine in Paris

History

France
- Name: Flore
- Namesake: Flora
- Ordered: 3 August 1804
- Builder: Rochefort, plans by Pierre-Jacques-Nicolas Rolland
- Laid down: 1 July 1805
- Launched: 11 November 1806
- Acquired: 14 June 1810
- Commissioned: 1807
- Stricken: 27 November 1811
- Fate: Wrecked 30 November 1811

General characteristics
- Class & type: Armide-class frigate
- Displacement: 1430 tonneaux
- Tons burthen: 759 port tonneaux
- Length: 47 m (154 ft)
- Beam: 12 m (39 ft)
- Draught: 5.5 m (18 ft)
- Propulsion: Sail

Flore was a 44-gun or 40-gun Armide-class frigate of the French Navy.

== Service history ==
In 1808, she was part of Ganteaume's squadron that cruised in the Mediterranean.

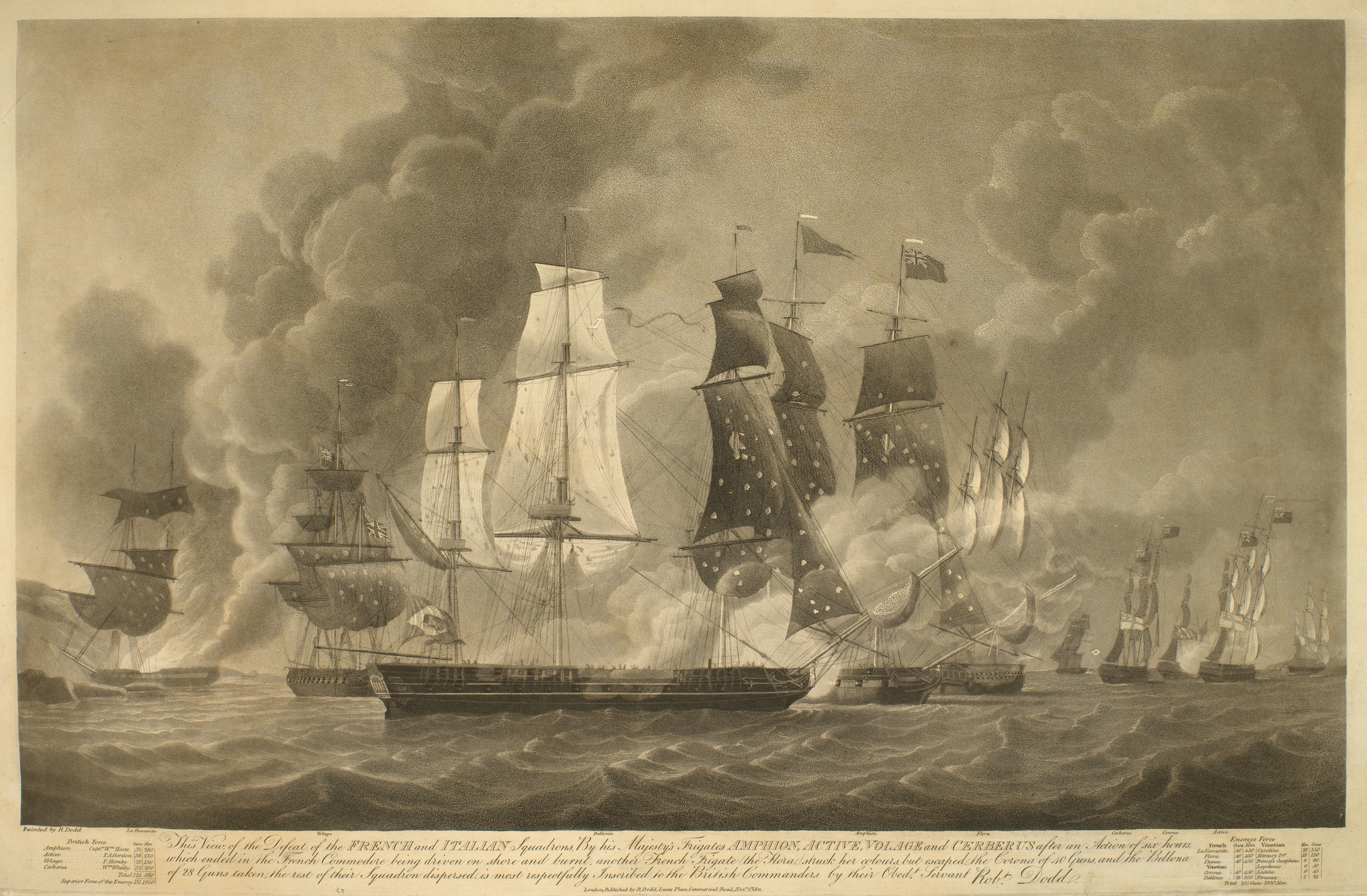
Flore (fifth from left) at the Battle of Lissa, 1811, by Robert Dodd

On 12 March 1811, she was part of Bernard Dubourdieu's squadron sailing to raid the British commerce raider base of the island of Lissa. The squadron encountered William Hoste's frigate squadron, leading to the Battle of Lissa.

In the ensuing fight, Flore was distanced by her flagship Favorite, which engaged the British flagship HMS Amphion, and ran aground. Flore and Bellona caught on and engaged Amphion in a crossfire. Amphion outmanoeuvred Flore and raked her for ten minutes, after which Flore struck her colours.

The battle still raging, the British failed to send a capture crew aboard, and Flore eventually joined the surviving Carolina and Danaé and fleeing to Ragusa.

Flore was wrecked in a tempest off Chioggia on 30 November 1811, with the loss of 75. Her commanding officer, Frigate captain Lissilour, was acquitted by the court martial.

A 1/48 shipyard model of Flore, originally part of the Trianon model collection, is on display at the Musée national de la Marine in Paris.

== Bibliography ==
- Roche, Jean-Michel (2005). Dictionnaire des bâtiments de la flotte de guerre française de Colbert à nos jours 1 1671–1870. p. 205. ISBN 978-2-9525917-0-6. OCLC 165892922.
