= S122 =

S122 may refer to:

- HMS Audacious (S122), a 2012 proposed Astute-class nuclear Fleet submarine of the Royal Navy
- S Matrozos (S 122), a Type 214 submarine
