= Armide-class frigate =

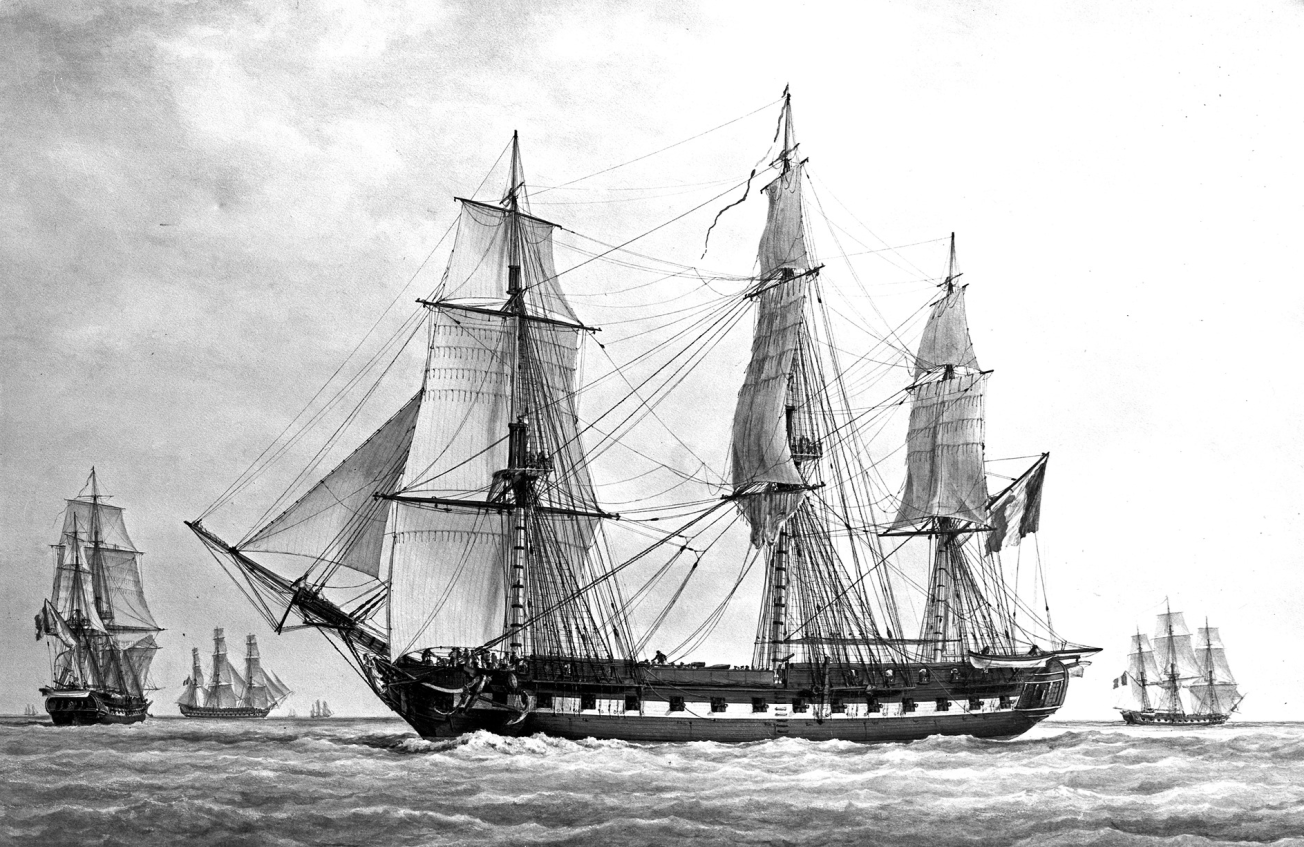
- Painting of Pénélope by François-Geoffroi Roux

Class overview
- Name: Armide class
- Builders: Plans by Pierre Roland
- Operators: French Navy
- Preceded by: Preneuse class
- Succeeded by: Carrère class
- In commission: 1804 - 1823
- Planned: 15
- Building: 15
- Completed: 12
- Canceled: 3

General characteristics
- Class & type: Frigate
- Displacement: 1430 tonneaux
- Tons burthen: 759 port tonneaux
- Length: 47 m (154 ft)
- Beam: 12 m (39 ft)
- Draught: 5.5 m (18 ft)
- Propulsion: Sail
- Armament: 44 guns: 28 18-pounders; 16 8-pounders; 2 6-pounders; 2 36-pounder carronades
- Armour: Timber

The Armide class was a class of 44-gun frigates of the French Navy, designed by Pierre Roland. A highly detailed and accurate model of Flore, one of the units of the class, is on display at Paris naval museum, originally part of the Trianon model collection.

== Vessels in class ==
- Armide

Builder: Rochefort Dockyard
Begun: 16 November 1802
Launched: 24 April 1804
Completed: May 1804
Fate: captured by British Navy, 25 September 1806.

- Minerve

Builder: Rochefort Dockyard
Begun: 11 May 1804
Launched: 9 September 1805
Completed: November 1805
Fate: captured by British Navy, 25 September 1806.

- Pénélope

Builder: Bordeaux
Begun: 12 February 1804
Launched: 28 October 1806
Completed: January 1807
Fate: broken up, after November 1829.

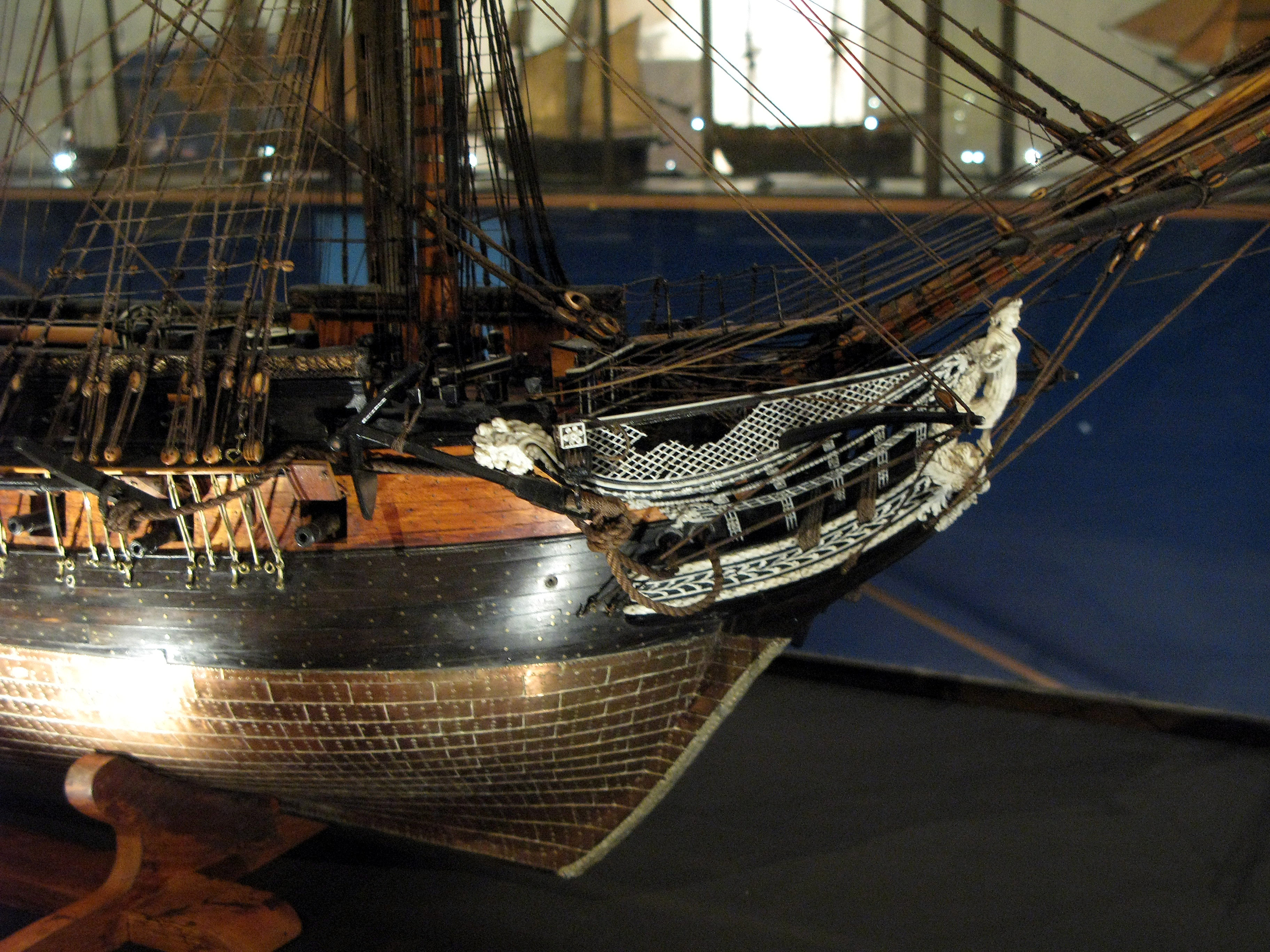
1/48 scale model of Flore, on display at the Musée national de la Marine in Paris

- Flore

Builder: Rochefort Dockyard
Begun: 1 July 1804
Launched: 11 November 1806
Completed: March 1807
Fate: wrecked, 1811.

- Amphitrite

Builder: Cherbourg Dockyard
Begun: August 1806
Launched: 11 April 1808
Completed: July 1808
Fate: burnt, 3 February 1809, to avoid capture.

- Niémen

Builder: Bordeaux
Begun: May 1807
Launched: 8 November 1808
Completed: January 1809
Fate: captured by British Navy, 6 April 1809.

- Saale (ex Andromède)

Builder: Rochefort Dockyard
Begun: 10 December 1806
Launched: 28 October 1810
Completed: February 1811
Fate: deleted, 1821 and broken up.

- Alcmène

Builder: Cherbourg Dockyard
Begun: 4 July 1810
Launched: 3 October 1811
Completed: March 1812
Fate: captured by British Navy, 16 January 1814.

- Circé

Builder: Rochefort Dockyard
Begun: February 1810
Launched: 15 December 1811
Completed: March 1812
Fate: deleted, 1844 and broken up.

- Androméde

Builder: Bayonne
Begun: 22 June 1808
Launched: not launched
Completed: cancelled April 1811
Fate: never reached launch stage.

- Emeraude

Builder: Bayonne
Begun: 22 June 1808
Launched: not launched
Completed: cancelled April 1811
Fate: never reached launch stage.

- Cornélie

Builder: Bordeaux
Begun: January 1812
Launched: capsized on stocks 10 March 1814
Completed:
Fate: never reached launch stage.

- Antigone

Builder: Bordeaux
Begun: January 1812
Launched: 13 March 1816
Completed: May 1816
Fate: Deleted 3 August 1828 and hulked

- Cléopâtre

Builder: Cherbourg Dockyard
Begun: 10 March 1812
Launched: 1 April 1817
Completed: June 1817
Fate: Deleted 30 September 1823 and broken up

- Magicienne

Builder: Rochefort Dockyard
Begun: January 1813
Launched: 11 April 1823
Completed:May 1823
Fate: Wrecked 29 November 1840 in the Philippines

== Sources and references ==
- Roche, Jean-Michel (2005). Dictionnaire des bâtiments de la flotte de guerre française de Colbert à nos jours, 1671–1870. Group Retozel-Maury Millau. ISBN 978-2-9525917-0-6. OCLC 165892922.
- Winfield, Rif; Roberts, Stephen S (2015). French Warships in the Age of Sail 1786—1861: Design Construction, Careers and Fates. Seaforth. ISBN 978-1-84832-204-2.
