= French ship Audacieux =

Many ships of the French Navy have borne the name Audacieux or Audacieuse, which means audacious in French, including:

- French frigate Audacieuse (1692), a frigate built at Dunkerque, later a commerce raider, then coastguard vessel, and struck 1707
- French ship Audacieux (1784), a Téméraire-class 74-gun ship of the line, broken up in 1803
- French gunboat Audacieuse (1804), a gunboat in service until retired in 1814
- French ship Audacieux, a Téméraire-class 74-gun ship of the line, ordered in 1805 but completed in 1807 as Pultusk
- French frigate Audacieuse (1856), an Ardente-class frigate, broken up in 1872
- French torpedo boat Audacieux (1890), an Agile-class torpedo boat, sunk in collision in 1896 off Corsica
- French torpedo boat Audacieux (1900), a Cyclone-class torpedo boat, launched in 1900, used as a target from 1923 and broken up in 1926
- French minesweeper Audacieuse (1916), an Agile-class minesweeper, later gunboat, condemned in 1940
- French destroyer L'Audacieux (1934–1943), a Le Fantasque-class destroyer, sunk in 1943
- French patrol vessel L'Audacieuse (P682) a P400-class patrol vessel or L'Audacieuse-class patrol boat launched in 1984

== See also ==
- FV Audacieux, a French fishing vessel in service 1945–50s
- List of ships named Audacious
