= French galley Réale =

Eleven French ships of the French Navy have borne the name Réale (royal):

- French galley Réale (1538), a galley
- French galley Réale (1639), a galley
- French galley Réale (1668), a galley
- French galley Réale (1669), a galley
- French galley Réale (1673), a galley
- French galley Réale (1679), a galley
- French galley Réale (1683), a galley
- French galley Réale (1694), a galley
- French galley Réale (1722), a galley
- French galley Réale (1733), a galley
- French galley Réale de France (1662), a prestige galley
