= French ship Triomphant (1809) =

Ship of the line of the French Navy

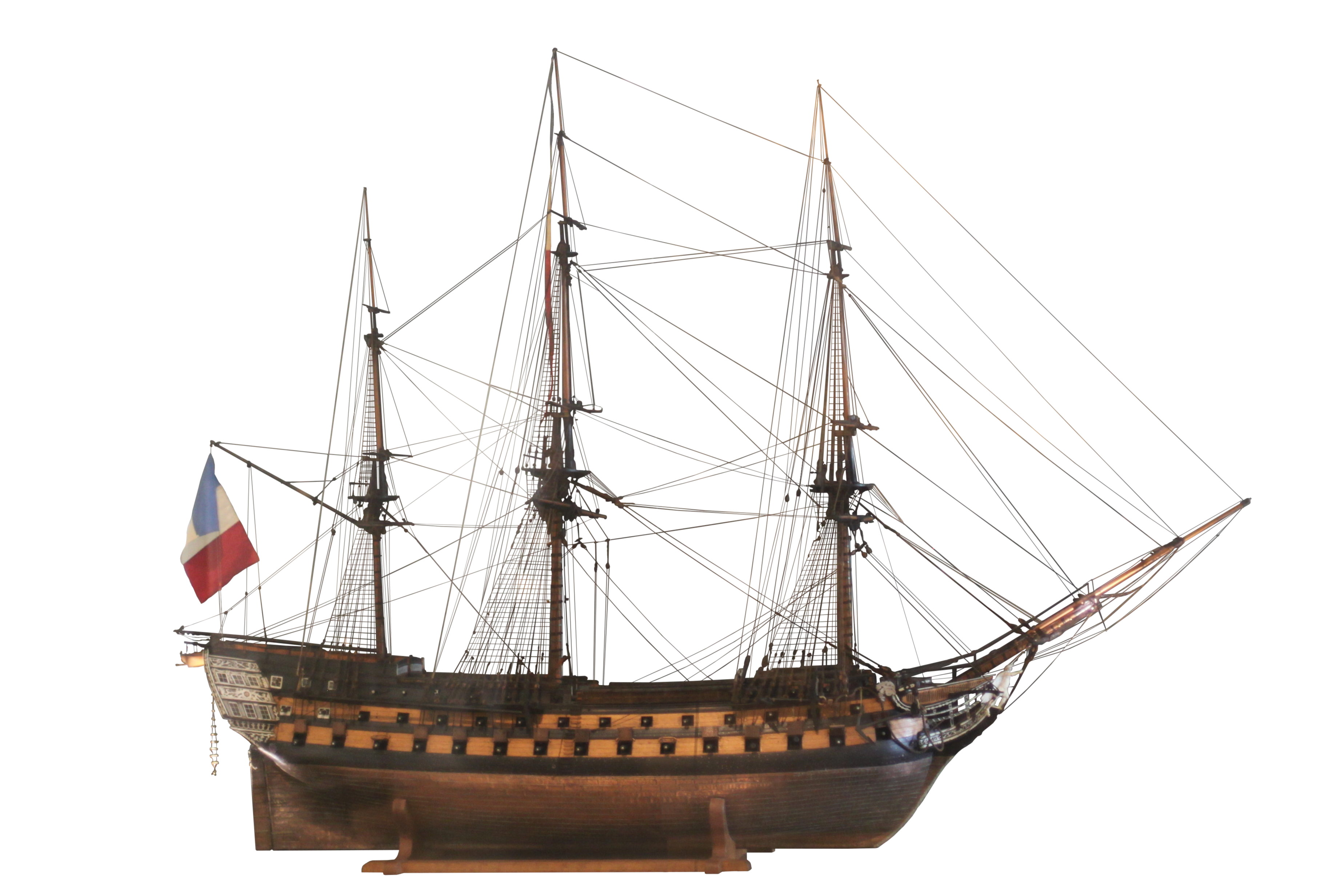
- Scale model of the Trianon model collection on display at the Musée de la Marine in Paris

History

France
- Name: Triomphant
- Namesake: "Triumphant"
- Builder: Arsenal de Rochefort
- Laid down: 1804
- Launched: 31 March 1809
- Fate: Hulk, 1828

General characteristics
- Class & type: Téméraire-class ship of the line
- Displacement: 3,069 tonneaux
- Tons burthen: 1,537 port tonneaux
- Length: 55.87 m (183 ft 4 in)
- Beam: 14.46 m (47 ft 5 in)
- Draught: 7.15 m (23.5 ft)
- Depth of hold: 7.15 m (23 ft 5 in)
- Sail plan: Full-rigged ship
- Crew: 705
- Armament: 74 guns: Lower gun deck: 28 × 36 pdr guns; Upper gun deck: 30 × 18 pdr guns; Forecastle and Quarterdeck: 16 × 8 pdr guns

Triomphant was a 74-gun Téméraire-class ship of the line built for the French Navy during the first decade of the 19th century. Completed in 1809, she played a minor role in the Napoleonic Wars.

== Description ==
Designed by Jacques-Noël Sané, the Téméraire-class ships had a length of 55.87 metres (183 ft 4 in), a beam of 14.46 metres (47 ft 5 in) and a depth of hold of 7.15 metres (23 ft 5 in). The ships displaced 3,069 tonneaux and had a mean draught of 7.15 metres (23 ft 5 in). They had a tonnage of 1,537 port tonneaux. Their crew numbered 705 officers and ratings during wartime. They were fitted with three masts and ship rigged.

The muzzle-loading, smoothbore armament of the Téméraire class consisted of twenty-eight 36-pounder long guns on the lower gun deck and thirty 18-pounder long guns on the upper gun deck. On the quarterdeck and forecastle were a total of sixteen 8-pounder long guns. Beginning with the ships completed after 1787, the armament of the Téméraires began to change with the addition of four 36-pounder obusiers on the poop deck (dunette). Some ships had instead twenty 8-pounders.

== Construction and career ==
Triomphant was ordered on 6 April 1804 and was laid down on 27 June 1806 at the Arsenal de Rochefort. She was launched on 31 March 1809. The ship was completed in May and commissioned on 1 July. Triomphant was recommissioned at Rochefort with the men of the Fourth Battalion of the Line 4^{e} bataillon de ligne on June 1810. The ship was decommissioned at Brest on 1 July 1814. She was condemned on 1 July 1822 and hulked as a storage ship. Triomphant was broken up at Brest in July–September 1825.

She served as the canonical 74-gun ship of the line in the Trianon model collection.

== Bibliography ==
- Roche, Jean-Michel (2005). Dictionnaire des bâtiments de la flotte de guerre française de Colbert à nos jours [Dictionary of French Warships from Colbert to Today]. Vol. 1: 1671-1870. Roche. ISBN 978-2-9525917-0-6. OCLC 165892922.
- Winfield, Rif and Roberts, Stephen S. (2015) French Warships in the Age of Sail 1786-1861: Design, Construction, Careers and Fates. Seaforth Publishing. ISBN 978-1-84832-204-2
