= Audacity =

Audacity means boldness.

Audacity may also refer to:

== Computing ==
- Audacity (audio editor), an audio editing application

== Music ==
- Audacity (Jae Stephens album), 2026
- Audacity (Ugly Duckling album), 2009
- Audacity (band), an American garage rock band
- "Audacity" (song), by Stormzy, 2019
- Audacity, a 2012 jazz album by George Garzone and Frank Tiberi with Rasmus Ehlers, Jakob Høyer, Jonas Westergaard

== Literary ==
- Audacity, a 1924 novel by Ben Ames Williams
- Audacity, a 2017 book by Jonathan Chait

== Military ==
- HMS Audacity (D10), a British naval vessel
- MV Audacity, a British merchant vessel renamed from Empire Audrey

== See also ==
- Audacious (disambiguation)
- Audacy, formerly Radio.com, a broadcast and internet radio platform
