= Louis Quinze (ship model) =

French Navy ship model

- Scale model of Louis Quinze-MnM 9 MG 1
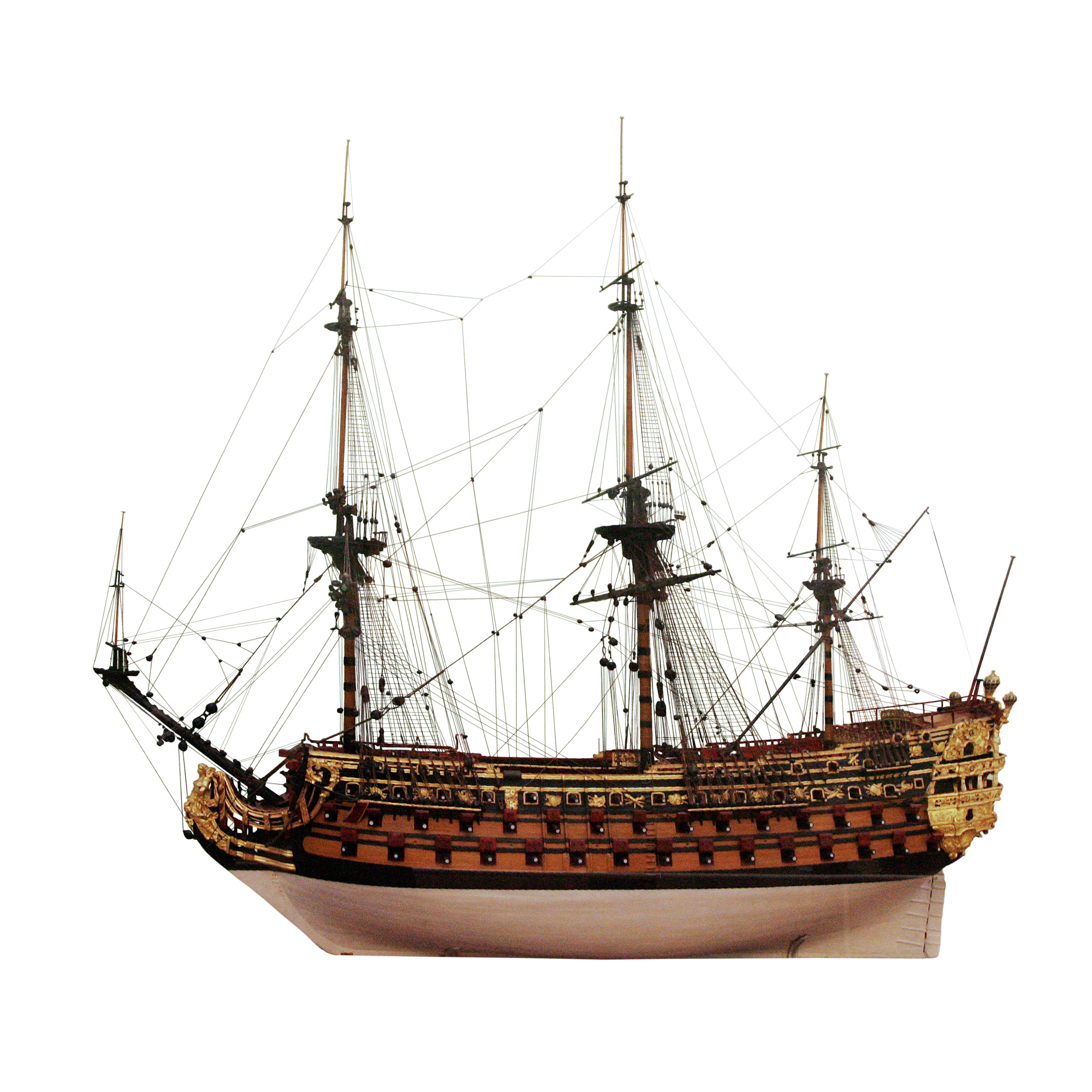
- Year: c. 1720
- Medium: wood, brass
- Dimensions: 216 cm (85 in) × 95 cm (37 in) × 220 cm (87 in)
- Location: Musée national de la Marine de Paris, France
- Collection: Collections of Musée national de la Marine de Paris
- Accession no.: 9 MG 1

Louis Quinze is a 1/36 scale model of a ship of the line of the French Navy, currently on display at the Musée national de la Marine. No actual ship of the French Navy bore the name or was built to these specifications.

== History ==
Louis Quinze depicts a 110-gun ship of the line, the strongest type built in France in the late 17th century. The model is attributed to one of the model workshops of the shipyards of the Navy, and dated to around 1720.

The model is lavishly decorated, a feature characteristic of prestige warships of the Louis XIV era. It served as educational support for royal princes, including the actual Louis XV when he was still heir to the throne.

The model features unrealistic details, notably archaisms and English manierism that were in fashion when it was made.

Views of the model
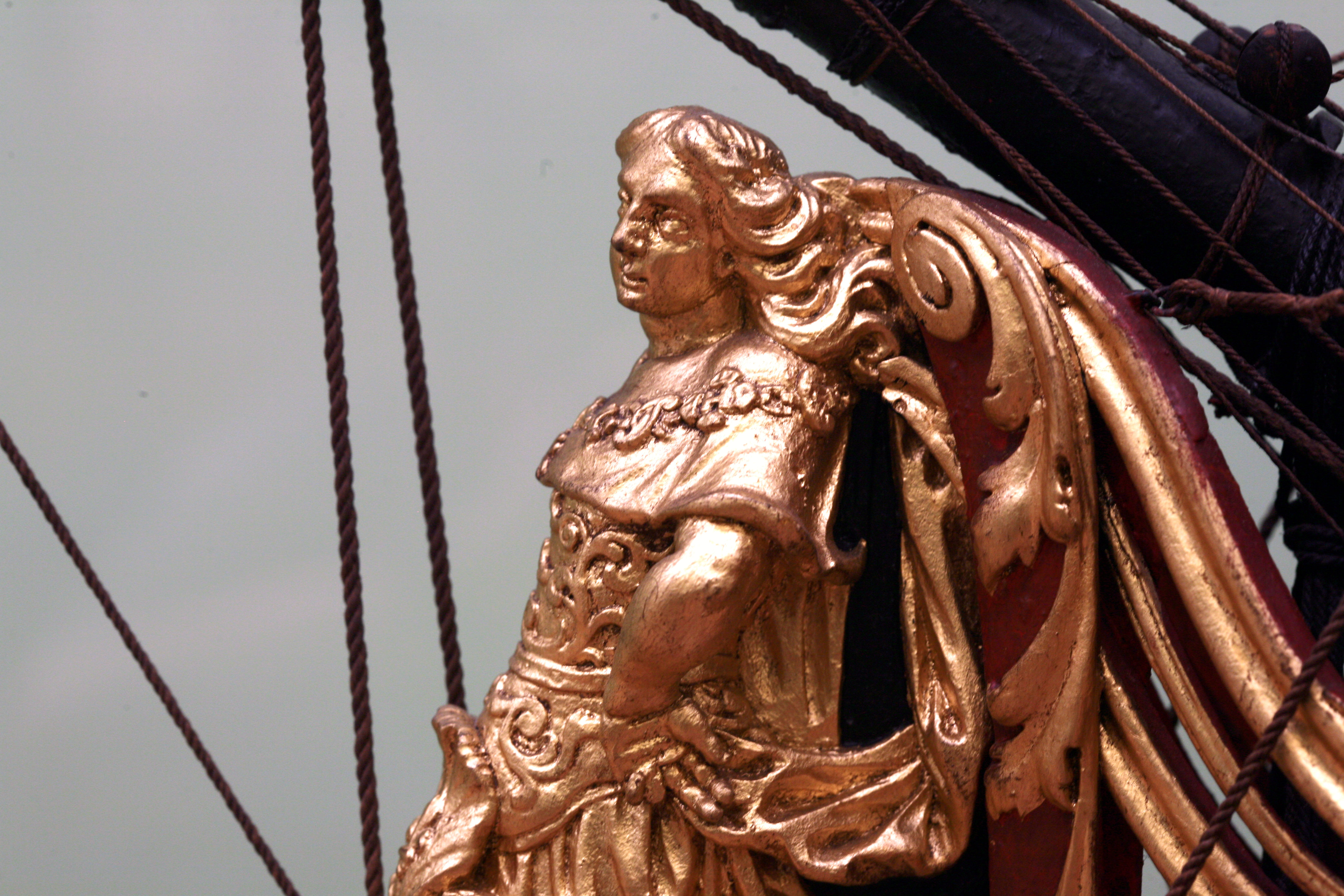
Figurehead featuring then-future Louis XV as a Roman emperor

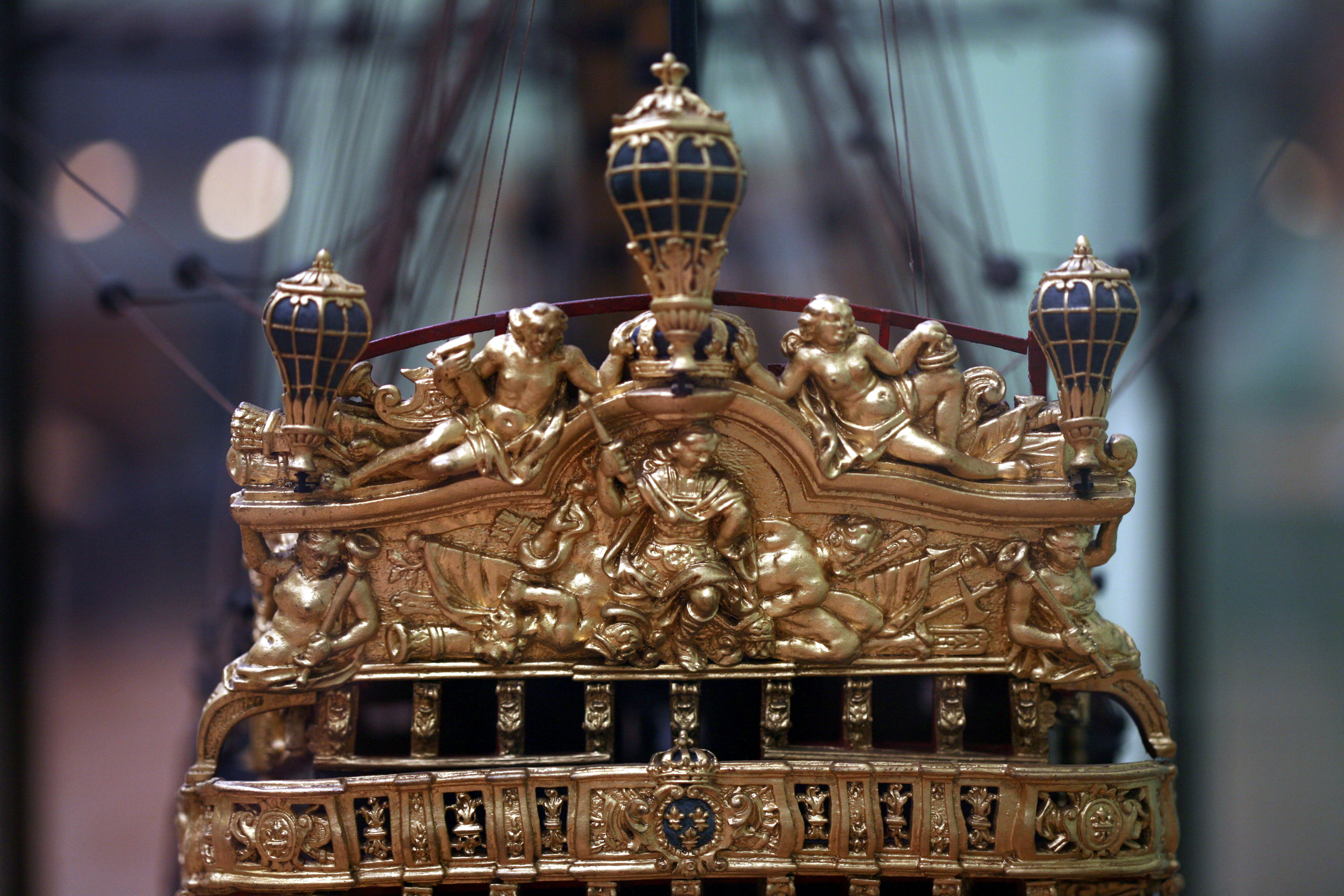
Aft decorations: Louis XV as a Roman emperor, coat of arms of France, marine caryatids and other symbolism

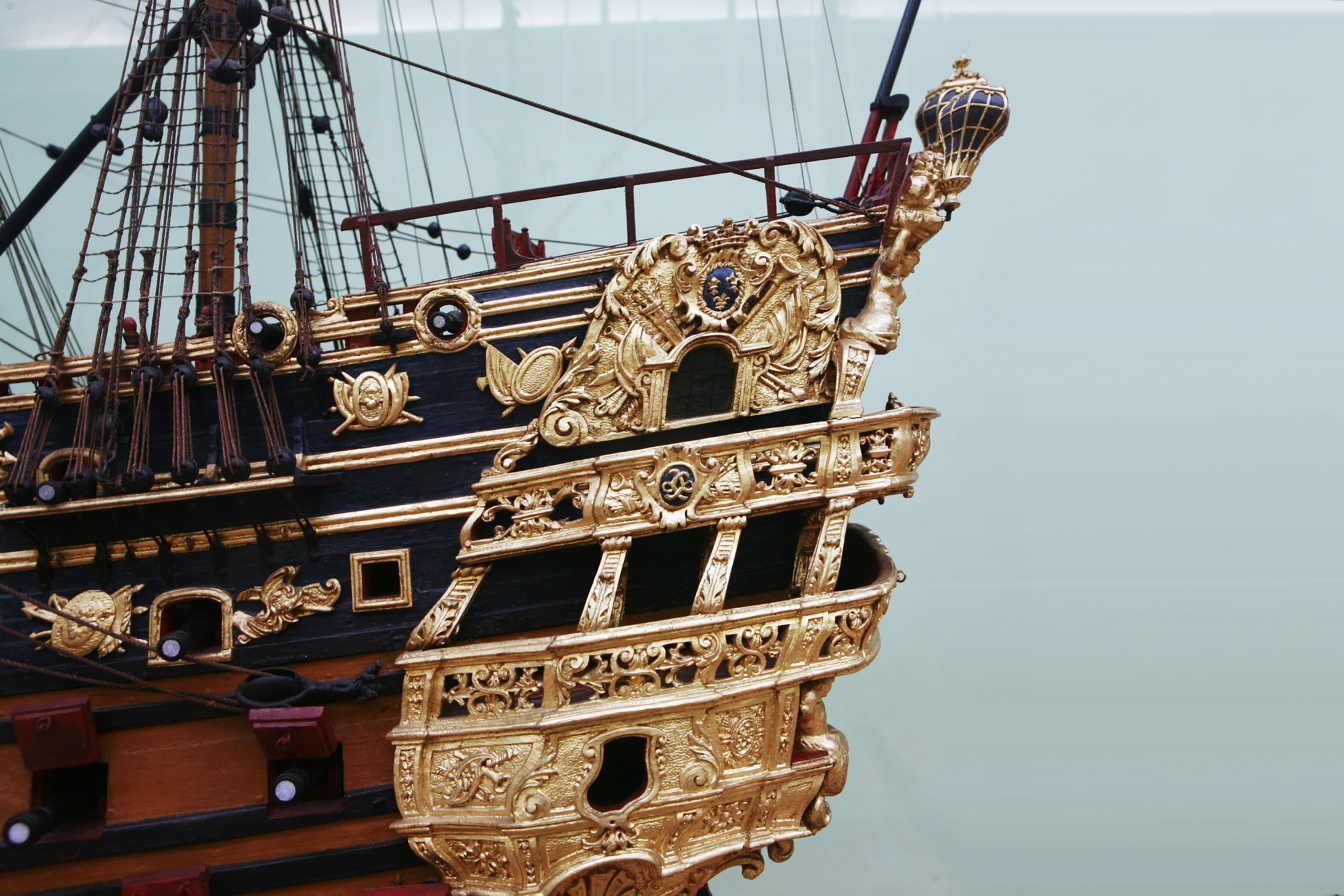
Lateral gallery

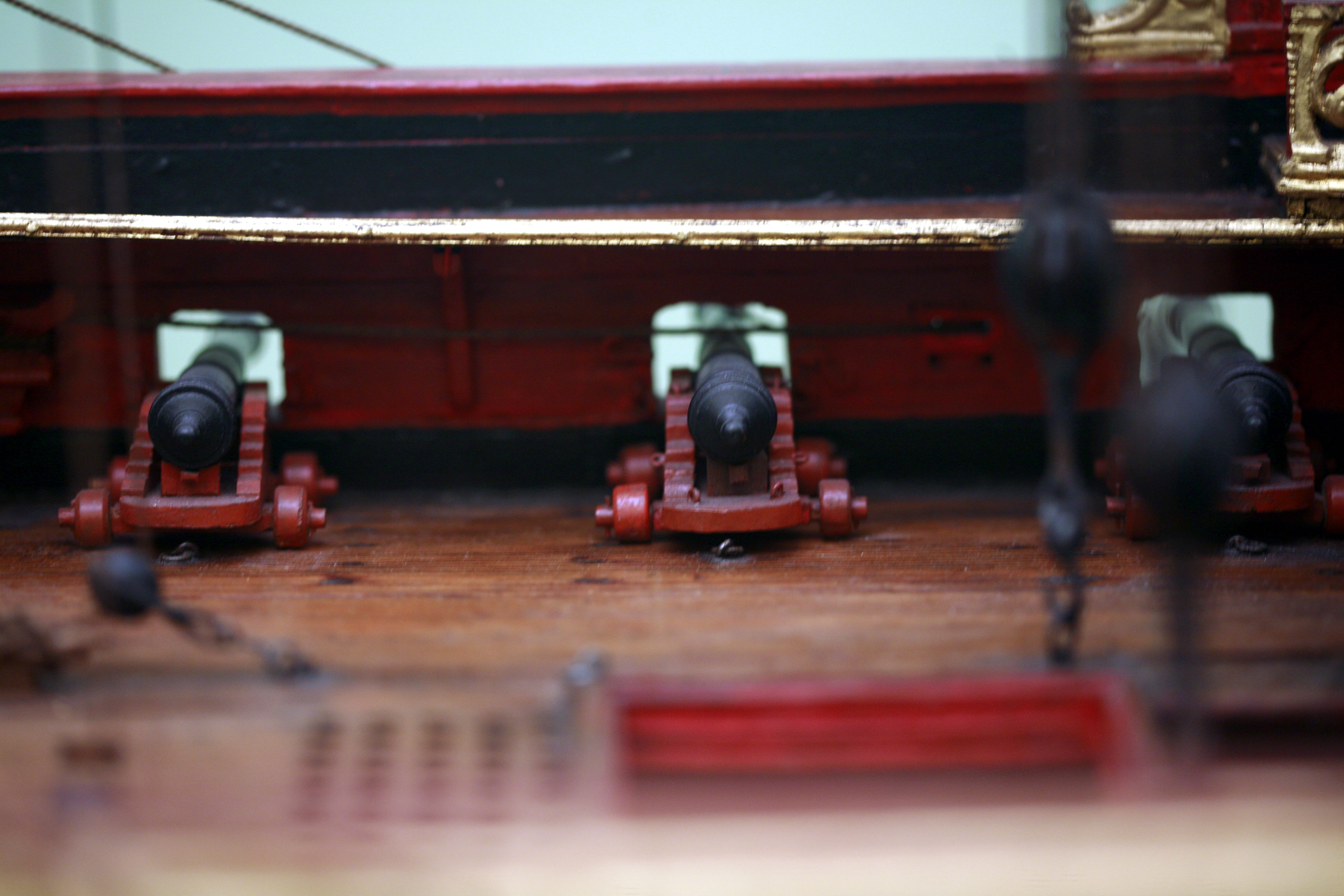
Quarterdeck armament

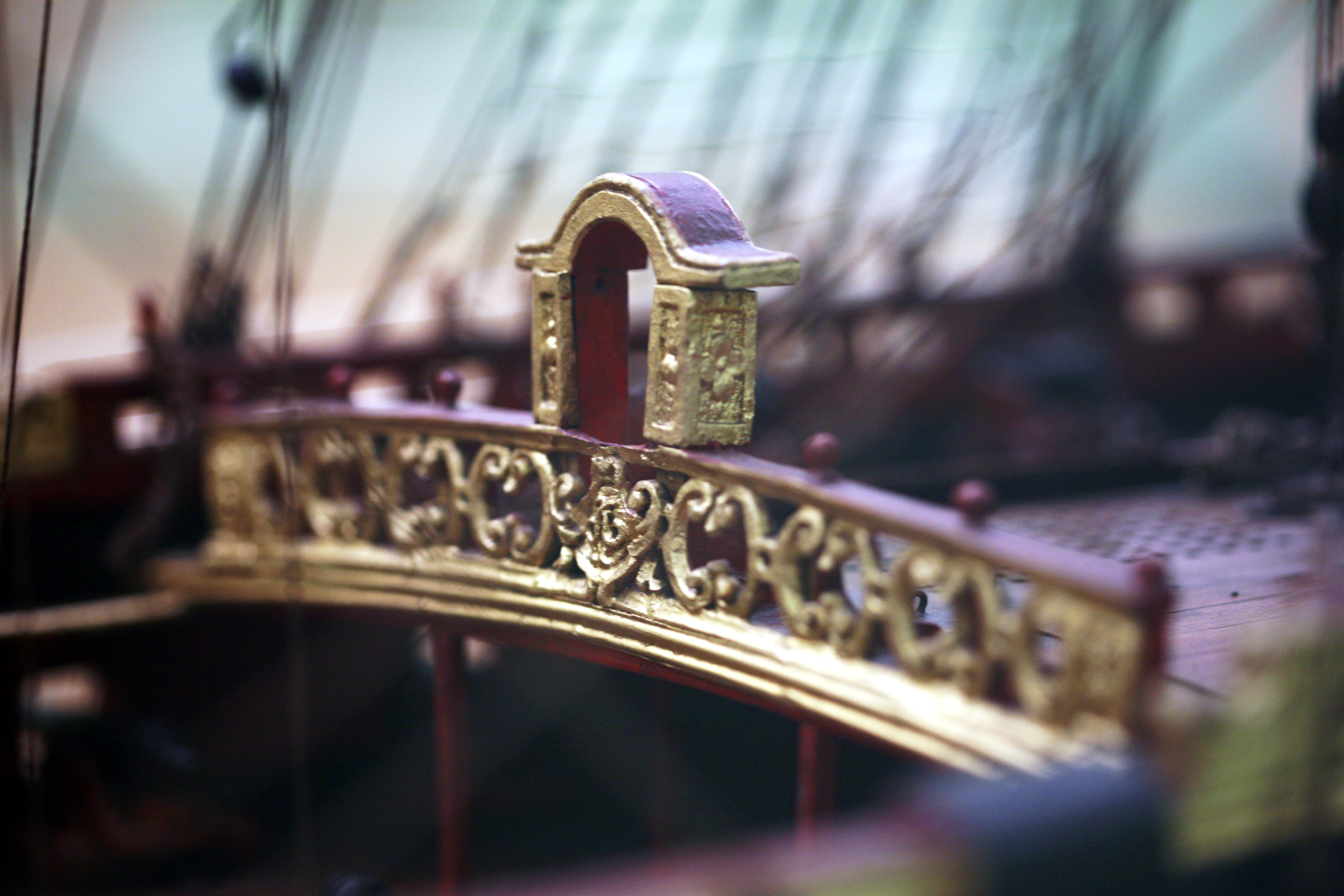
Ship's bell
