= List of ships named Audacious =

A number of ships have been named Audacious, including:

- HMS Audacious, several ships of the British Royal Navy
- SS Audacious (1913), the former Italian cargo ship built in 1913 as Belvedere, seized by the United States in 1941 and scuttled in 1944 on the Normandy coast
- USNS Audacious (T-AGOS-11), a US Navy Stalwart-class ocean surveillance ship built in 1989, renamed from USNS Dauntless. She is now NRP Dom Carlos I (A522) of the Portuguese Navy.

== See also ==
- French ship Audacieux, several ships of the French navy
