= Trianon model collection =

Collection of thirteen model ships

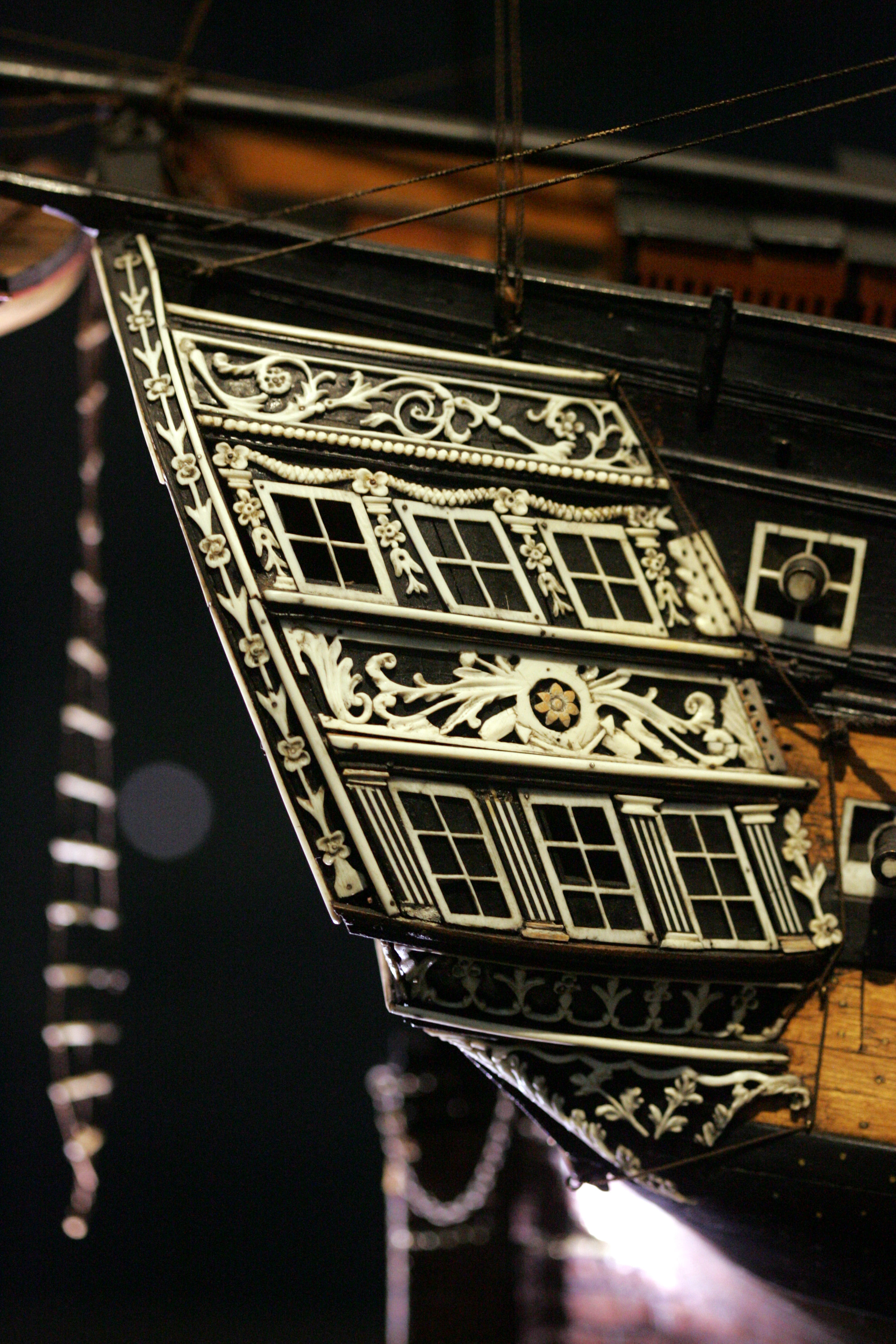
Stern of Triomphant represented for the Trianon collection.

The Trianon model collection is a set of high-quality ship models ordered by Napoléon for documentary purposes.

== History ==
In July 1810 Denis Decrès ordered 13 models to be constructed specially for the collection, while others, already built, were gathered. The models were built to a luxurious standard, with precious woods such as ebony and ivory used for the sculptures.

== Models ==
Type	Ship classes	Armament	Picture of the model	Ship	Note
Three-decker ship of the line	Océan class	118 guns		Océan	MnM 13 MG 20. Design by Sané
80-gun Two-decker ship of the line	Tonnant and Bucentaure class	80 guns		Friedland	Design by Sané
74-gun Two-decker ship of the line	Téméraire class	74 guns		Triomphant	MnM 17 MG 2. Design by Sané
64-gun Two-decker ship of the line	Artésien class	64 guns		Artésien	MnM 13 MG 3. The model represents an older type of ship and was selected, already built, to be displayed a Trianon.
18-pounder Frigate	Armide class	44 guns		Flore	MnM 17 MG 10. Design by Pierre Rolland
12-pounder Frigate	Galathée class	32 guns		Renommée	A model of the 18-pounder frigate Renommée (1806) was taken for this one, but the model of the Trianon collection is known to have been a 12-pounder frigate
Corvette	-	22 carronades		Bayadère	Model never completed
Brig		16 guns		Espérance	MnM 21 MG 33 Representative but fictitious ship. Model built especially for the Trianon collection.
Fluyt	Licorne-class fluyt	24 carronades and 2 guns		Normande	MnM 17 MG 12
Stable-Scow				Lionne	Design by François Pestel
Stable-Barge				Unnamed	
Sloop-gunboat (chaloupe-canonière)					
Cutter	-	16 guns		Unidentified	Design by Philippe Gresle
Xebec	Requin class	24 guns		Requin	The model represents an older type of ship and was selected, already built, to be displayed a Trianon.
Tartane					Model now lost
Lugger					
Gunboat (bateau canonnier)					
Caïque	-	1 gun and 1 howitzer		Unnamed	
Barge	-	20 guns		Foudroyante	MnM 17 MG 18 Representative but fictitious ship, distinct from the Foudroyante of 1795. Ancient model restored for the Trianon collection but never completed. Design by Pierre-Alexandre Forfait.

== Sources and References ==
=== Sources ===
- La "Collection Trianon"
- Maquettes de la marine impériale, Collection du musée de la Marine
