= German trawler V 405 J. Hinrich Wilhelms =

German fishing trawler

History
- Name: J. Hinrich Wilhelms (1934–44); Audacieux (1945– ); Helios ( –1958); Sopite (1958–74)
- Owner: Hochseefischerei Carl Kämpf Partenreederei. (1934–39); Kriegsmarine (1939–44); Unknown (1945-58); Cooperative Itsasokoa (1958-74)
- Port of registry: (Nazi Germany) Wesermünde, Germany (1934–39); Kriegsmarine (1939–44); Bordeaux, France (1945–58); Saint-Jean-de-Luz, France (1958-74)
- Builder: Deschimag Seebeckwerft
- Yard number: 522
- Launched: 6 October 1934
- Completed: 27 October 1934
- Commissioned: 22 September 1939
- Out of service: 1944–45
- Identification: Fishing boat registration PG 500 (1934–39); Code Letters DFBJ; Pennant Number V 405 (1939–44); Fishing boat registration BA 1494 (1958–61); Code Letters TPYZ (1945–74)
- Fate: Scrapped

General characteristics
- Type: Fishing trawler (1934–39); Vorpostenboot (1939–44); Fishing trawler (1945–61); Cargo ship (1961–74)
- Tonnage: 440 GRT, 161 NRT (1934–44); 451 GRT, 210 NRT (1945–61)
- Length: 51.35 metres (168 ft 6 in) (1934–61)
- Beam: 8.00 metres (26 ft 3 in)
- Draught: 4.65 metres (15 ft 3 in)
- Depth: 3.74 metres (12 ft 3 in)
- Installed power: Triple expansion steam engine, 123nhp (1934–58); Diesel engine (1958–74)
- Propulsion: Single screw propeller
- Speed: 12 knots (22 km/h)

J. Hinrich Wilhelms was a German fishing trawler that was requisitioned by the Kriegsmarine in the Second World War for use as a Vorpostenboot. She served as V 405 J. Hinrich Wilhelms. She was scuttled at Bordeaux, France in August 1944. Post-war, she was refloated and entered French merchant service as Audacieux and later Helios, then Sopite. Converted to a cargo ship in 1961, she was scrapped in 1974.

== Description ==
As built, Deutschland was 51.35 metres (168 ft 6 in) long, with a beam of 8.00 metres (26 ft 3 in). She had a depth of 3.74 metres (12 ft 3 in) and a draught of 4.65 metres (15 ft 3 in). She was assessed at 440 GRT, 162 NRT. She was powered by a triple expansion steam engine, which had cylinders of 35 centimetres (13 3/4 in), 55 centimetres (21 5/8 in) and 90 centimetres (35 7/16 in) diameter by 65 centimetres (25 9/16 in) stroke. The engine was made by Deschimag Seebeckwerft, Wesermünde, Germany. It was rated at 123nhp. The engine powered a single screw propeller driven via a low pressure turbine, double reduction gearing and a hydraulic coupling. It could propel the ship at 12 knots (22 km/h).

== History ==
The ship was built as yard number 521 by Deschimag Seekbeckwerft, Wesermünde for the Hochseefischerei Carl Kämpf Partenreederei, Wesermünde. She was launched on 6 October 1934 and completed on 27 October. The fishing boat registration PG 500 was allocated. She was allocated the Code Letters DFBJ.

J. Hinrich Wilhelms was requisitioned by the Kriegsmarine on 22 September 1939 for use as a vorpostenboot. She was allocated to 4 Vorpostenflotille as V 405 J. Hinrich Wilhelms. On 22 August 1944, she was scuttled at Bordeaux, Gironde, France.

J. Hinrich Wilhelms was refloated post-war, returning to merchant service as the French fishing boat Audacieux. The Code Letters TPYZ were allocated. By the 1950s, she had been renamed Helios. In 1958, she was re-engined with a diesel engine and renamed Sopite. She was now owned by the Cooperative Itsasokoa, Saint-Jean-de-Luz, Gironde. The fishing boat registration BA 1494 was allocated. The engine was a four-stroke single acting engine. It was built by Klöckner-Humboldt-Deutz, Köln. It had 6 cylinders of 32 centimetres (12 5/8 in) diameter by 45 centimetres (17 11/16 in) stroke. Sopite was assessed at 451 GRT, 210 NRT. In 1961 she was lengthened and converted to a cargo ship. She was scrapped in Spain in the third quarter of 1974.

== Sources ==
- Gröner, Erich (1993). Die deutschen Kriegsschiffe 1815-1945 (in German). Vol. 8/I: Flußfahrzeuge, Ujäger, Vorpostenboote, Hilfsminensucher, Küstenschutzverbände (Teil 1). Koblenz: Bernard & Graefe. ISBN 3-7637-4807-5.
