= French frigate Gomer =

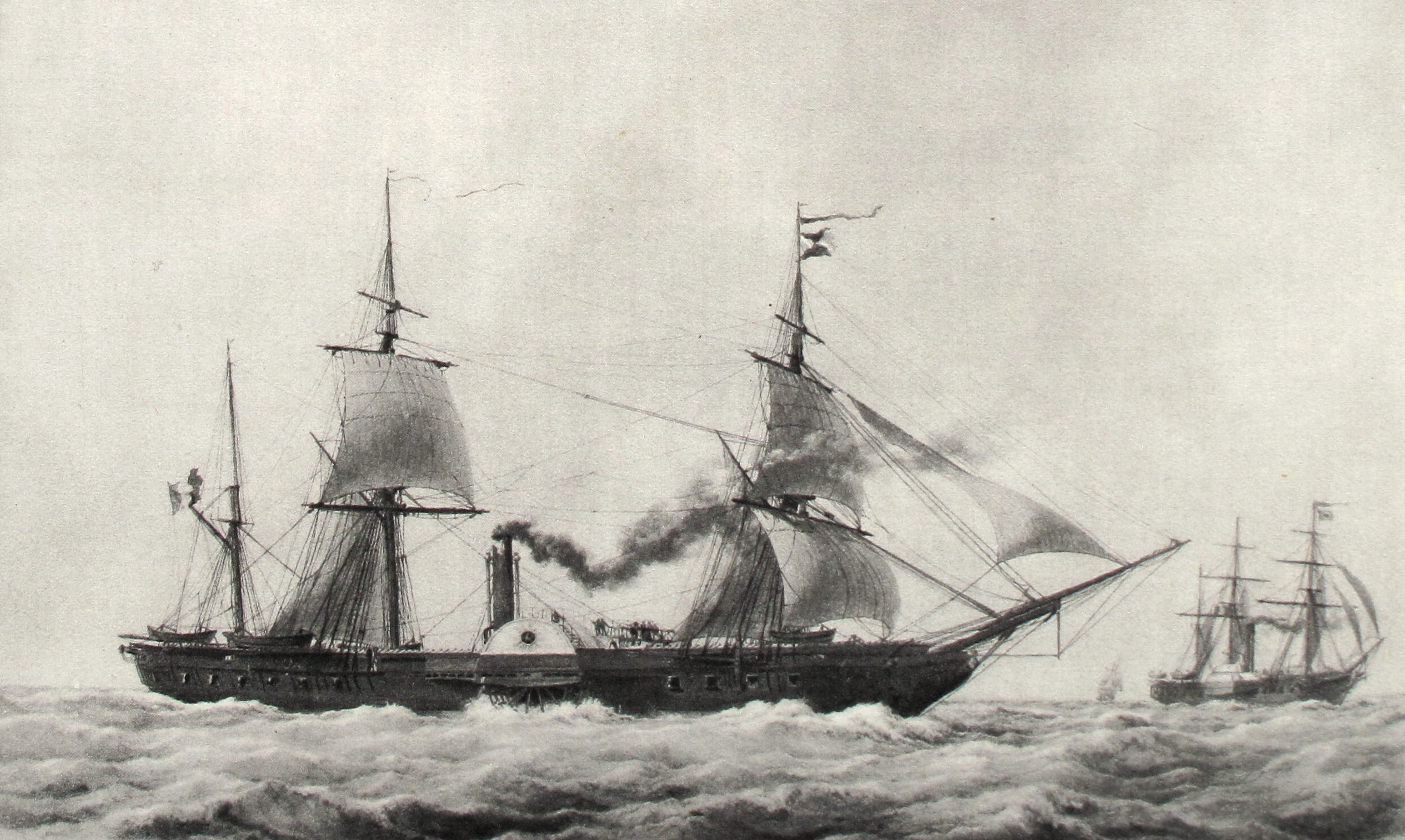
- Gomer, by Roux

History

France
- Name: Gomer
- Builder: Rochefort
- Laid down: 25 September 1840
- Launched: 19 July 1841
- Commissioned: 15 December 1841
- Stricken: 30 May 1868
- Fate: Broken up 1868

General characteristics
- Class & type: Gomer-class frigate
- Length: 72.75 m (238 ft 8 in)
- Beam: 12.45 m (40 ft 10 in)
- Height: 5.54 m (18 ft 2 in)
- Complement: 267
- Armament: 6 × 16 cm (6.3 in) howitzers; 8 × 30-pounders

Gomer was a paddle frigate of the French Navy, lead ship of her class.

She served in the Caribbean in 1843, and later served off France and England after being refitted as a royal yacht for Louis-Philippe. In August 1843, while serving in the Caribbean, the frigate crew suffered an outbreak of yellow fever, which necessitated the captain to request medical aide from the Pensacola Navy Yard hospital. The crew were under treatment from 23 August to 29 September 1843.

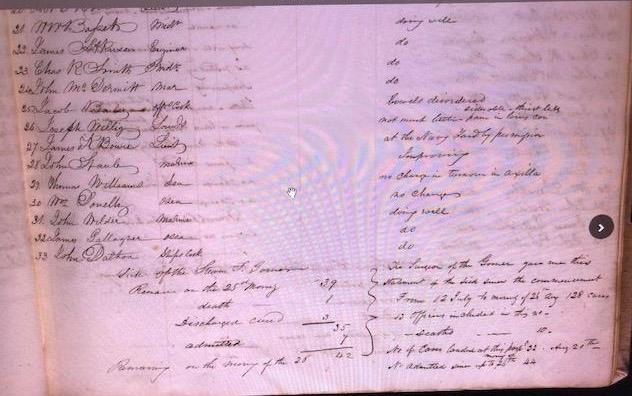
Patient Register Pensacola Navy Hospital dated 11 September 1843, p.75., entry and notation by Dr. Isaac Hulse USN,. Entry records medical assistance given French steam frigate Gomer, during an outbreak of yellow fever

In 1851, she took part in the Bombardment of Salé. During the Second French Empire, she took part in the Crimean War and in the French intervention in Mexico.

She was decommissioned in 1868 and broken up soon afterward.
