= French galley Réale (1694) =

Galley flagship of France

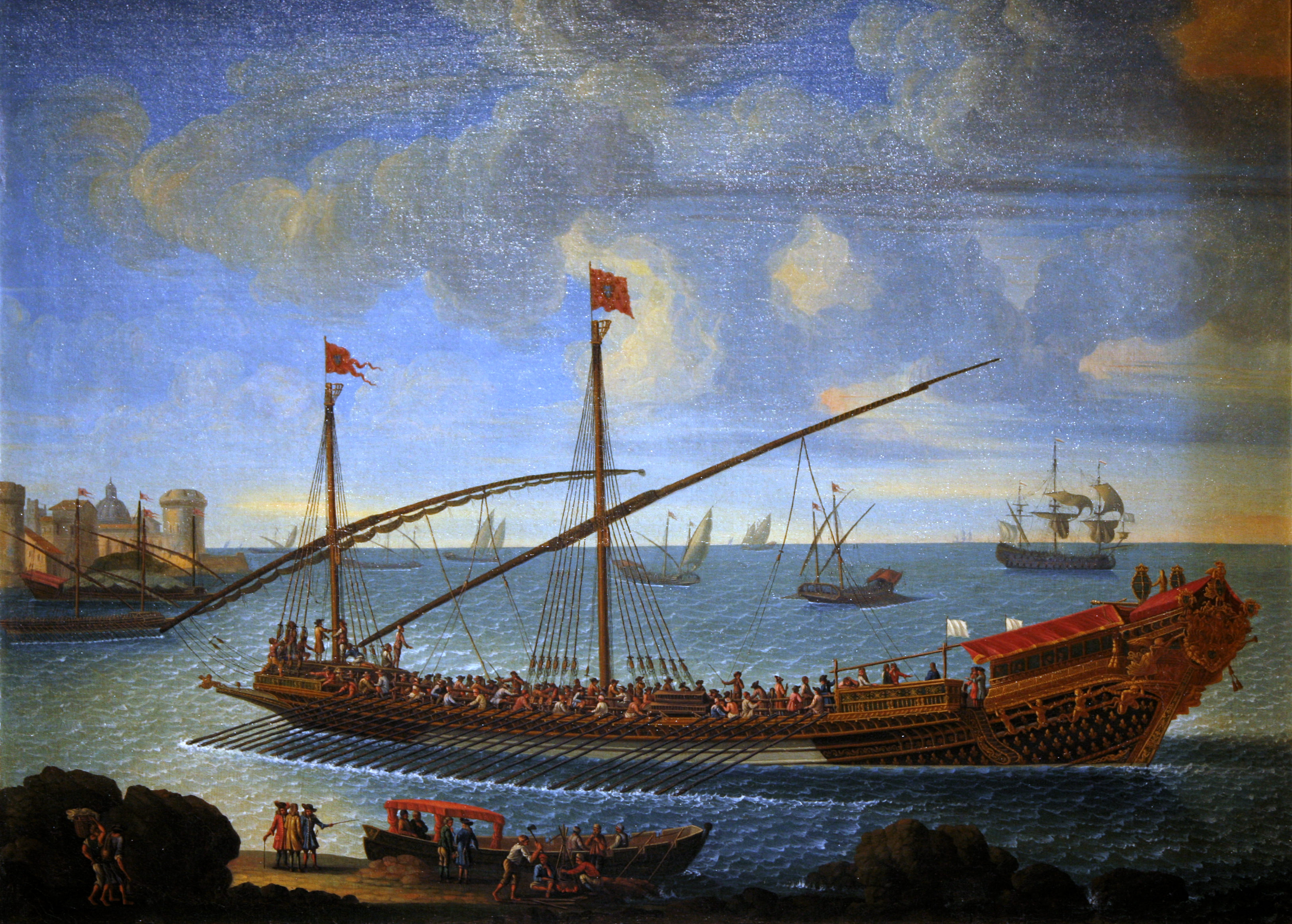
- The Réale returning to port

History

Kingdom of France
- Namesake: "Royal"
- Laid down: December 1692
- Launched: April 1694
- Commissioned: May 1694
- Decommissioned: 1720

General characteristics
- Displacement: 280 tonneaux
- Length: 57 m (187 ft)
- Beam: 7.7 m (25 ft)
- Draught: 2.5 m (8 ft 2 in)
- Propulsion: Sail; 30 pairs of oars, 6 rowers to each oar
- Complement: 360 rowers; 45 oar officers; 35 officers; 110 soldiers
- Crew: 550 (total)
- Armament: one 36-pounder; two 8-pounders; two 6-pounders

Réale ("royal") was a galley of the French galley corps, and the flagship of the French galley fleet under Louis XIV. She was designed by Jean-Baptiste Chabert, and built in Marseille between 1692 and 1694.

== Status ==
Réale was termed a galère extraordinaire ("extraordinary galley") since she had a larger crew than normal fleet galleys.

The status of Réale was thus defined:

(Réale) is the name of the main galley of an independent kingdom, not of a tributary kingdom annexed to a greater one. The Réale, in France, is reserved for the general of the galleys and flies the royal ensign which distinguishes it from the others. This ensign is square in shape and red in colour, with golden fleurs-de-lys. The main galley of the Pope is also named Réale because of the precedence granted by all crowned heads of Roman Catholic States to this leader of the Church of Rome. The Kingdoms of Cyprus and Candia, once the possessions of the Republic of Venice, give it permission to grant the quality of Réale to the first among its galleys. The Genoese argue for the same rights because of the Kingdom of Corsica. But the contests for the right of salute between this (Genoese Réale) and captains from Tuscany and Malta have long kept her from taking to sea. The main galleys of Naples, Sicily and Sardinia are each called captains Réale.

== Legacy ==
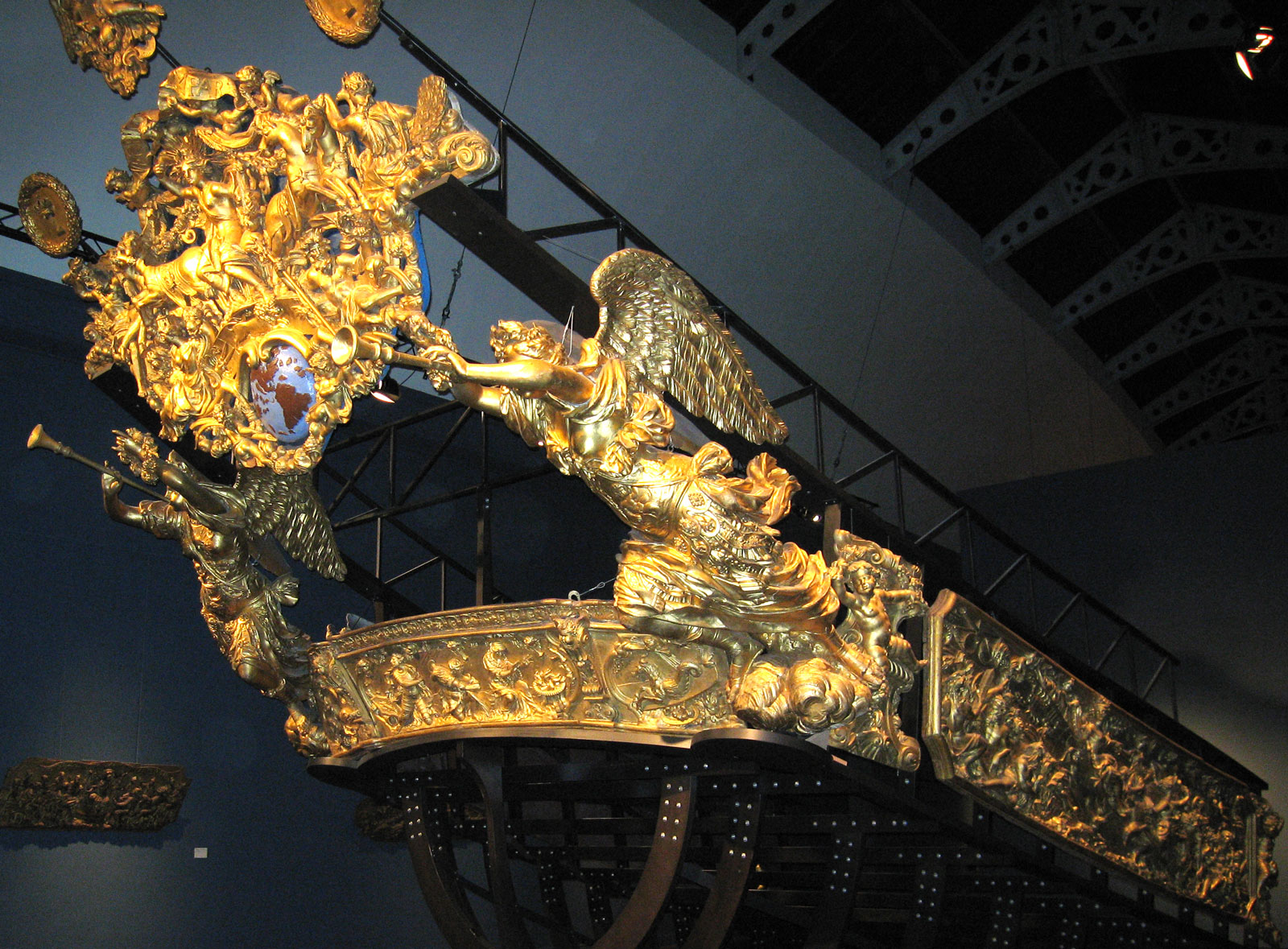
Stern decorations of Réale

The decorations of the stern are on display at the Musée de la Marine in Paris. The museum also features a contemporary model of an ordinary galley modified to look like the Réale.
