= French frigate Audacieuse (1856) =

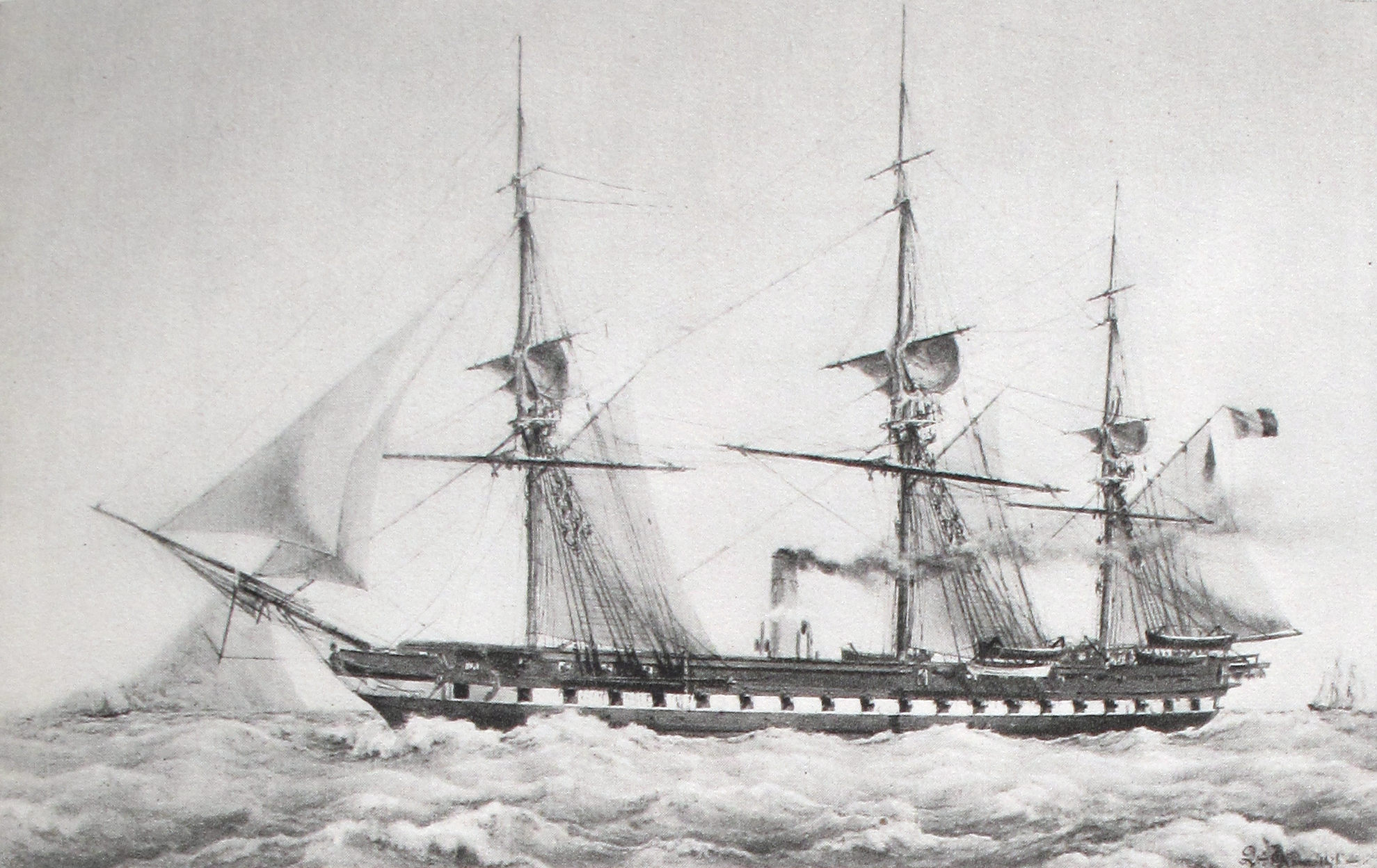
- Audacieuse, drawn by Roux

History

France
- Name: Audacieuse
- Namesake: "Audacious"
- Builder: Brest
- Laid down: 1854
- Launched: 22 January 1856
- Decommissioned: September 1864
- Out of service: 11 April 1879
- Reinstated: December 1864
- Fate: Deleted in 1872

General characteristics
- Class & type: Ardente-class frigate
- Displacement: 1,960 tonnes
- Length: 74 m (242 ft 9 in)
- Beam: 14.7 m (48 ft 3 in)
- Draught: 3.9 m (12 ft 10 in)
- Installed power: 2,650 ihp (1,980 kW)
- Propulsion: Steam engine, one propeller
- Sail plan: Ship-rigged
- Speed: 8.5 knots (15.7 km/h; 9.8 mph)
- Complement: 530 men
- Armament: 5 × 30-pounder long guns; 6 × 30-pounder howitzers

Audacieuse was an Ardente-class frigate of the French Navy.

== Career ==
Audacieuse served between France and the Far East, notable ferrying ambassador Jean-Baptiste Louis Gros to China in 1857 and bringing guns from the Taku Forts to France.

== Legacy ==
The Musée national de la Marine in Paris has a model of Audacieuse on display.

Model on display in Paris
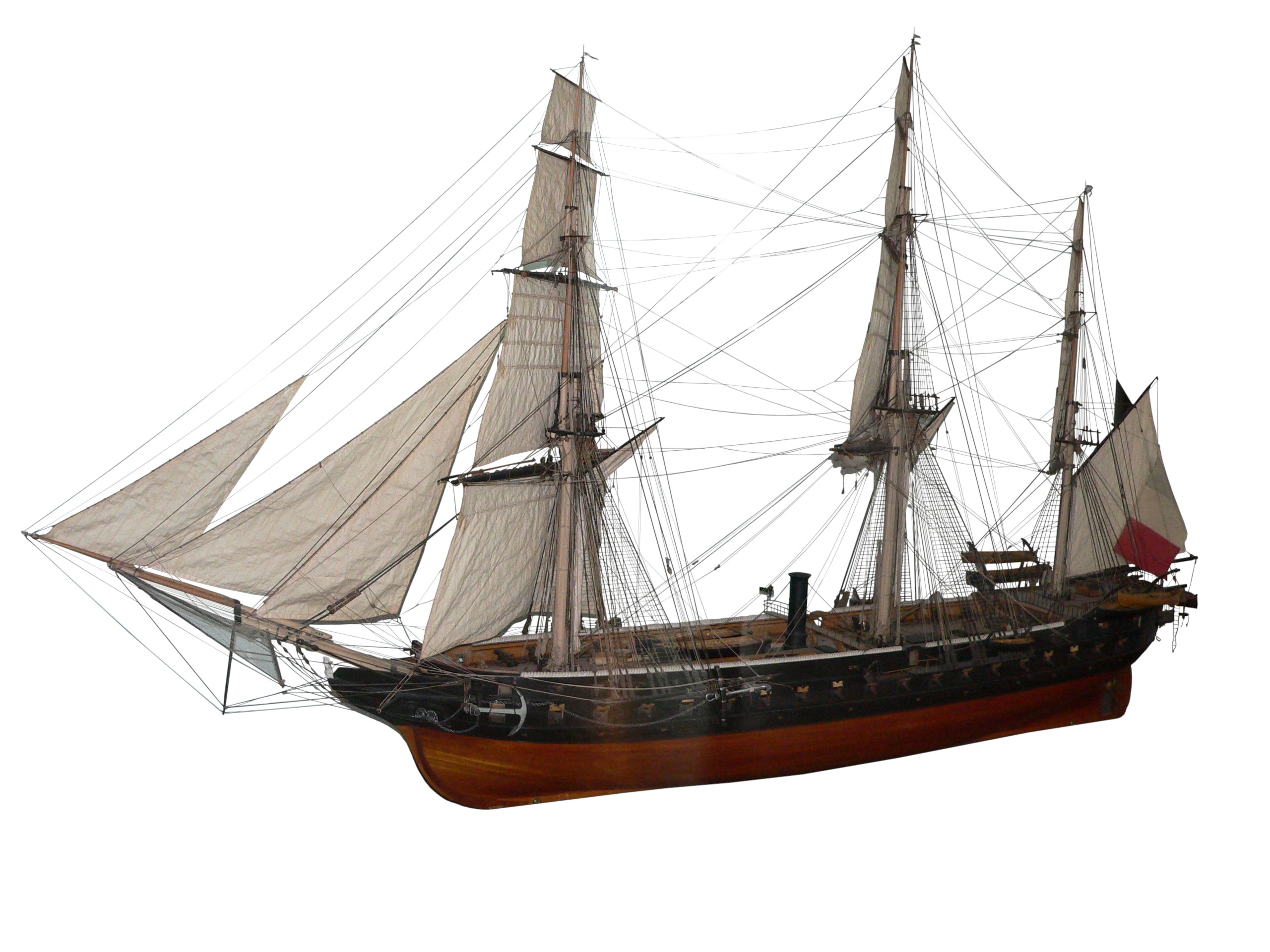
Model on display in Paris
