= Musée national de la Marine =

Maritime museum in Paris

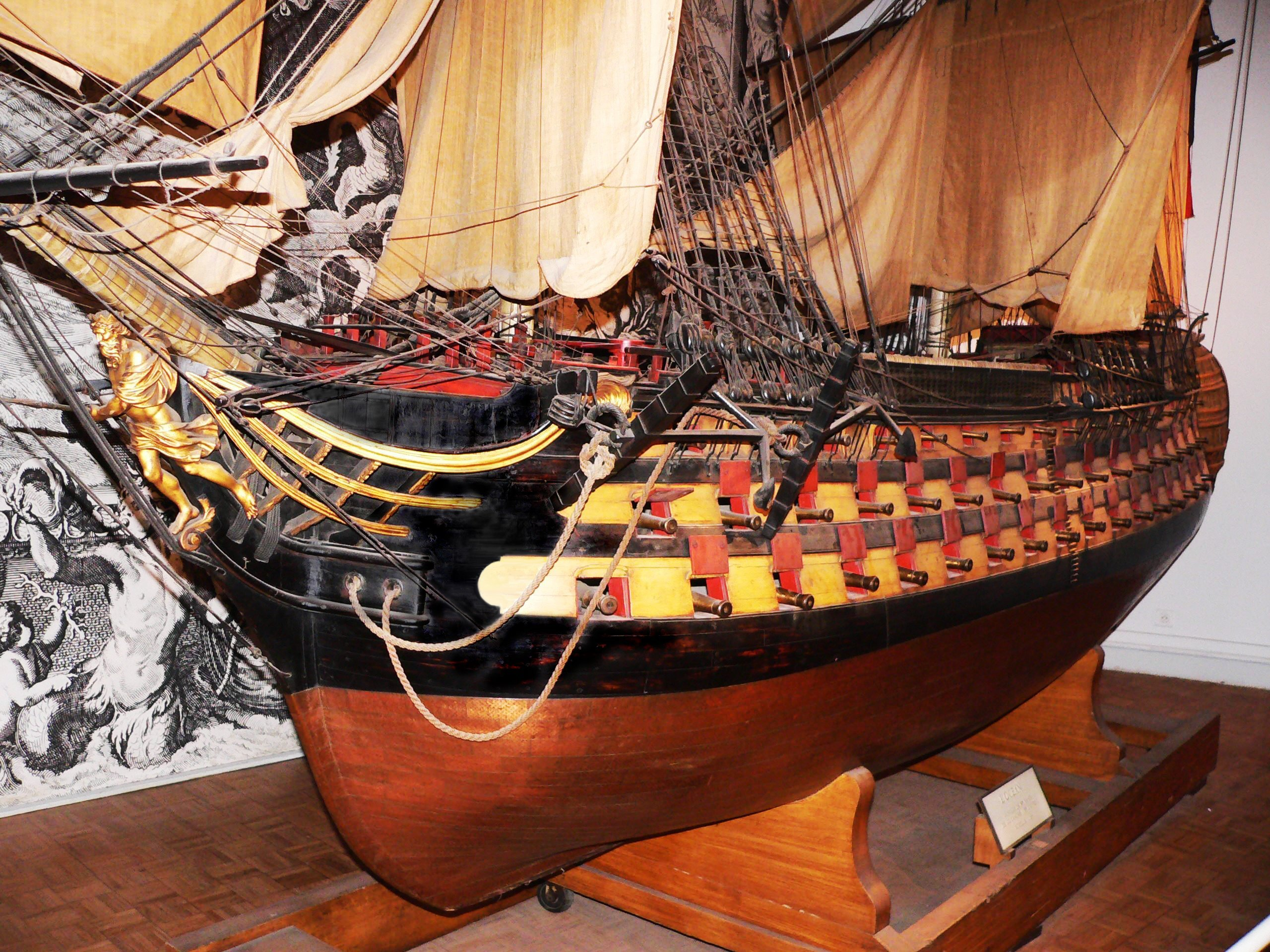
- 1/16-scale model of the Océan at the entrance of the museum

- Location within Paris
- Established: December 27th, 1827
- Location: Palais de Chaillot 17, place du Trocadéro 75116 PARIS
- Coordinates: 48.8620°N 2.2875°E
- Type: maritime museum
- Director: Vice Amiral Jean-Noël Gard
- Public transit access: Trocadéro
- Website: musee-marine.fr

The Musée national de la Marine (French pronunciation: [myze nɑsjɔnal də la maʁin]; "National Navy Museum"; Breton: Mirdi broadel ar morlu) is a maritime museum located in the Palais de Chaillot, Trocadéro, in the 16th arrondissement of Paris. It has annexes at Brest, Port-Louis, Rochefort (Musée National de la Marine de Rochefort), and Toulon. The permanent collection originates in a collection that dates back to King Louis XV.

== History ==
In 1748, Henri-Louis Duhamel du Monceau offered a collection of models of ships and naval installations to Louis XV, with the request that the items be displayed at the Louvre and made available to students of the Naval engineers school, which Duhamel headed. The collection was put on display in 1752, in a room of the first floor, next to the Academy of Sciences; the room was called "Salle de Marine" (Navy room), and was used for teaching.

With the French Revolution, the Salle de Marine closed in 1793. The collection was added to models owned by the King personally, to others owned by the Ministry of Navy, and yet others owned by émigrés or executees (notably Philippe Égalité). A short-lived museum was opened between 1801, and 1803, at the Ministry of Navy, then located at Place de la Concorde.

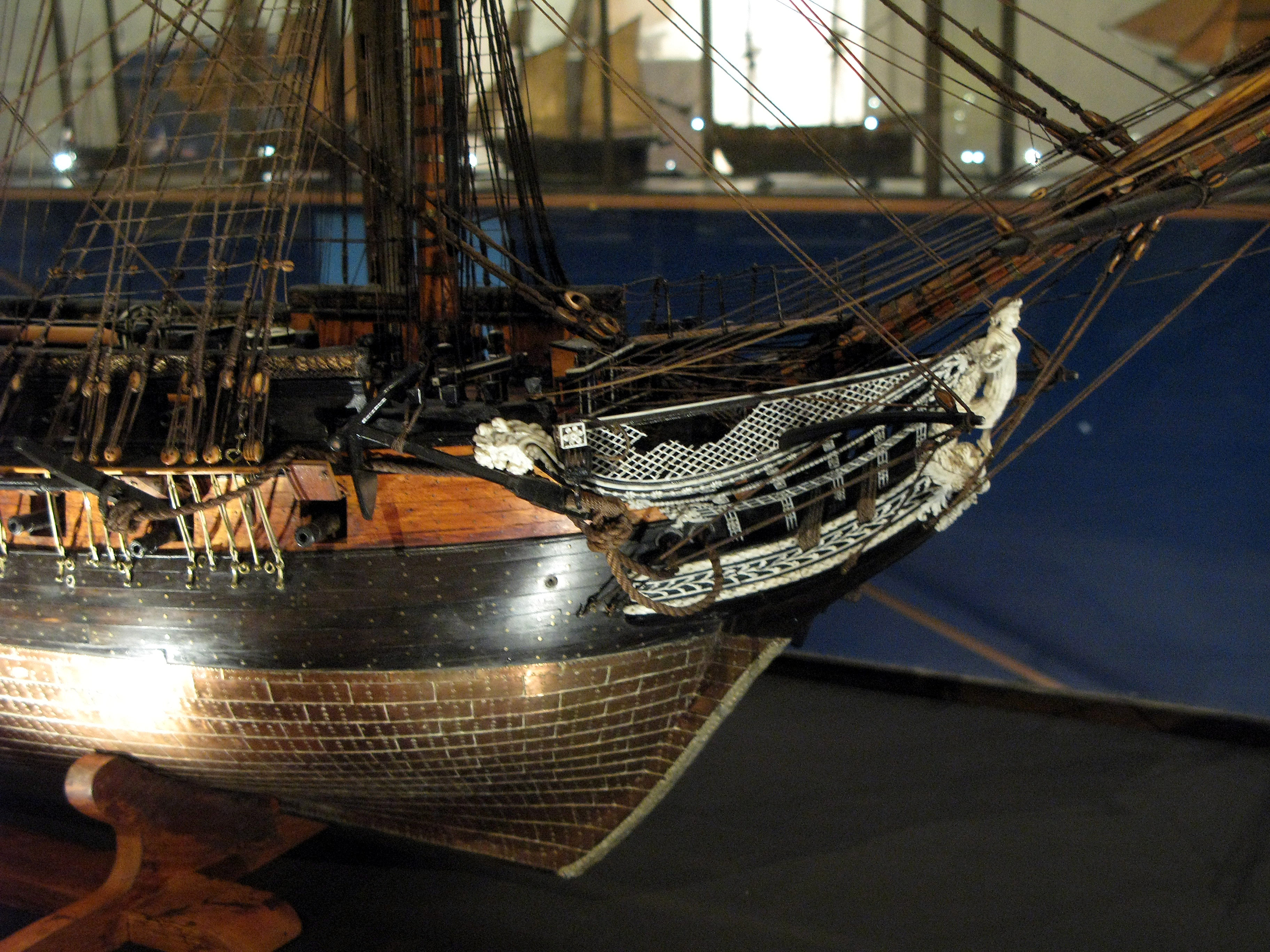
Model of the frigate Flore, one of the items of the Trianon collection.

In 1810, Napoleon ordered a gallery of 19 models, known as the Trianon model collection, to be put on display in his offices at Grand Trianon, as to document the types of warships in usage in the French Navy at the time. Jacques-Noël Sané was put in charge of the task. Napoleon also had a model of the frigate Muiron in his bedroom at Château de Malmaison.

In 1827, after the Bourbon Restoration, Charles X ordered a Naval museum to be opened at the Louvre. The task was given to Pierre Zédé. Rooms were also opened or restored in Cherbourg, Brest, Lorient, Rochefort and Toulon.

In 1852, Antoine Léon Morel-Fatio became curator of the Museum. He emphasised the importance of painting, adding to the works of Joseph Vernet. He also made a catalogue of the items, and reorganised the ethnographic items of the collection.

In 1871, Admiral François-Edmond Pâris became curator, and had over 400 models of small crafts indigenous to different locations of the French Empire constructed.

From 1905, ethnographic items were transferred to other museums, and in 1920, the administration of the Museum was transferred to the French Navy. In 1937, part of the Palais de Chaillot was devoted to harbouring the museum, which opened on 15 August 1943.

From 1971, the museum became an autonomous body under the Ministry of Defence. In 1975, it was instrumental in the restoration of the Port-Louis fortress in Brittany. In 1992, it purchased Éric Tabarly's Pen Duick V, now serving in the French Navy as a sailing school ship.

== Gallery ==
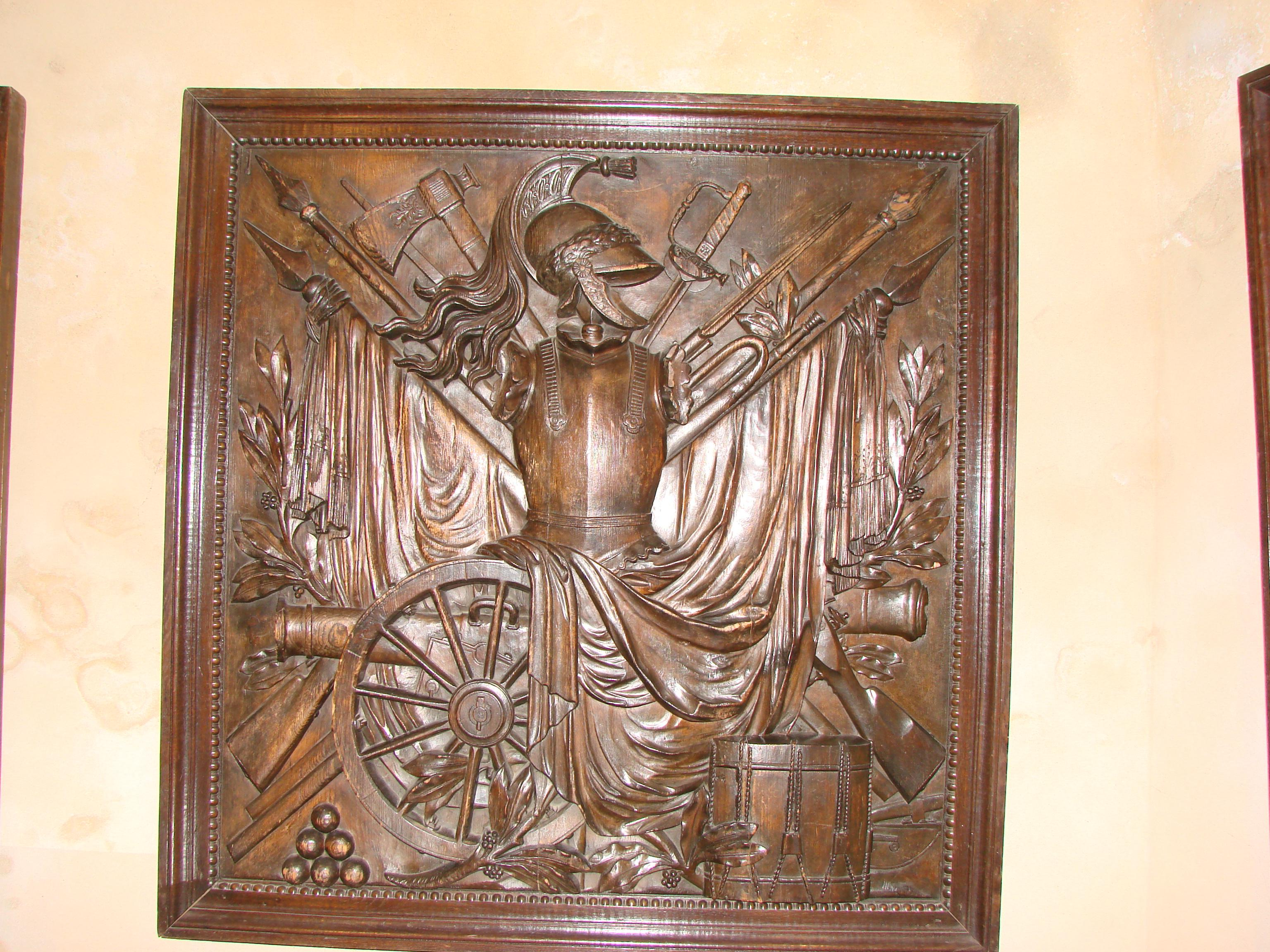
Military-themed metal plate exhibited in the Musée national de la Marine.

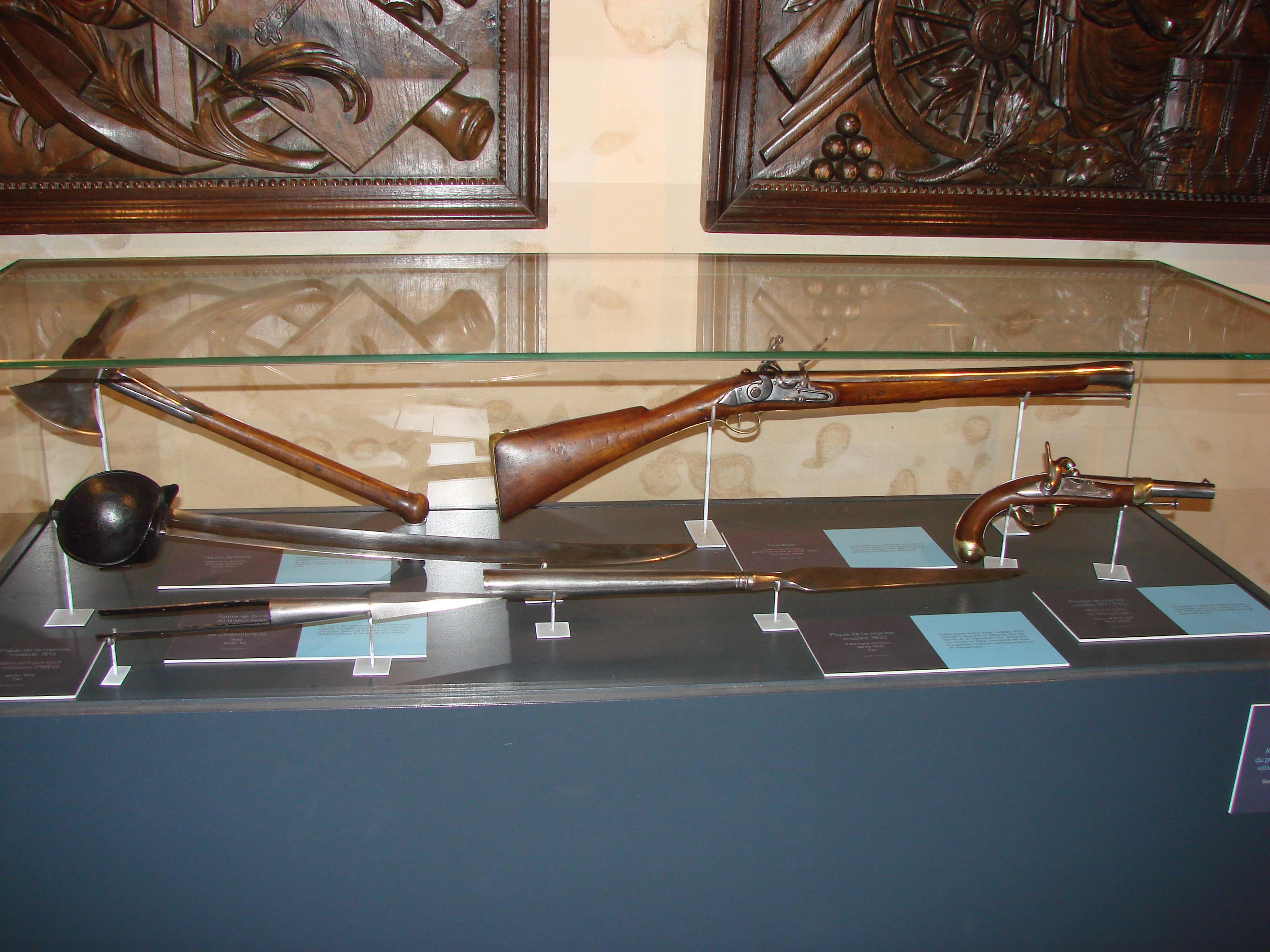
Old weapons exhibited in the Musée national de la Marine.

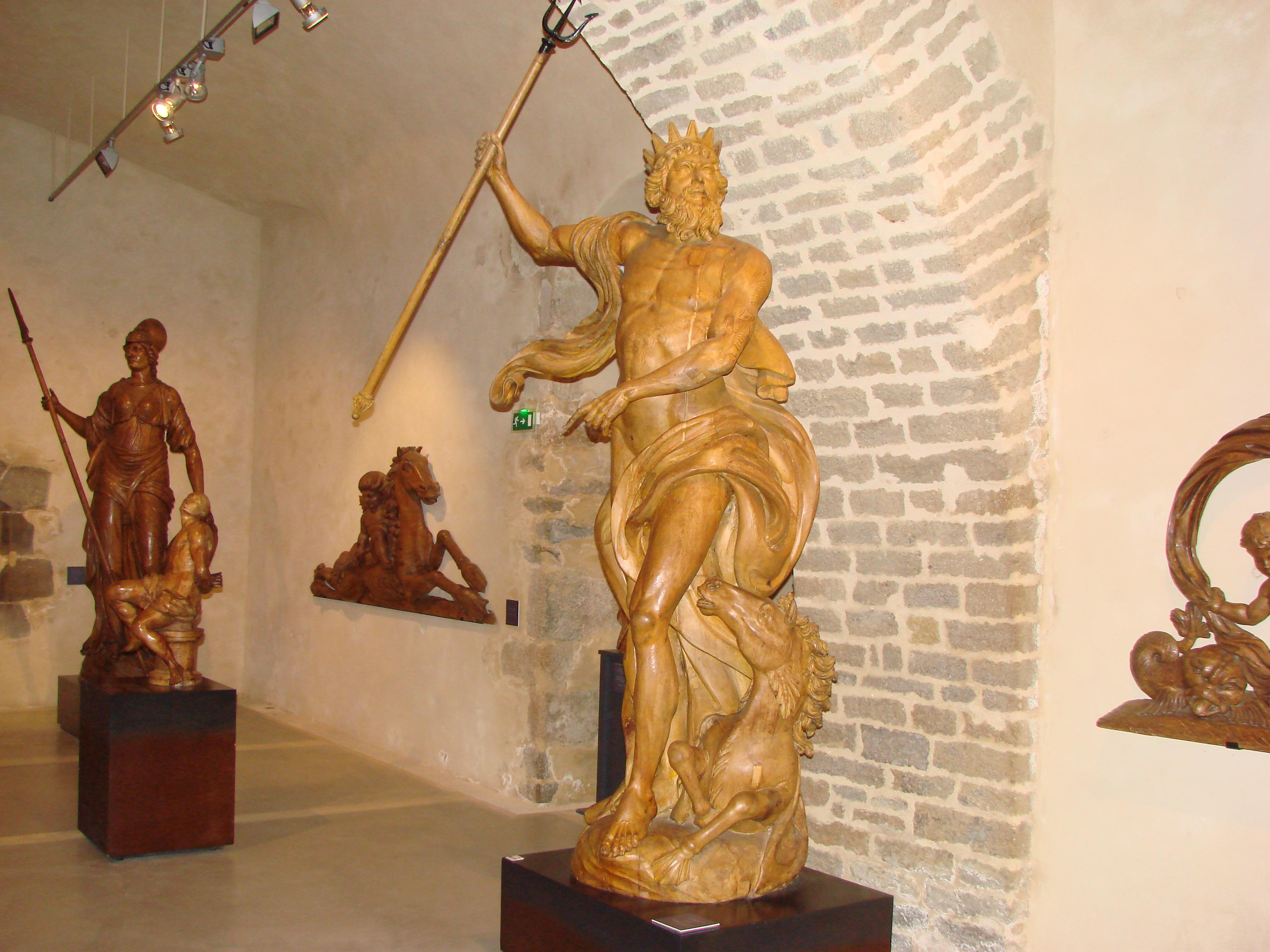
Neptune sculpture by Yves Collet exhibited in the Musée national de la Marine.

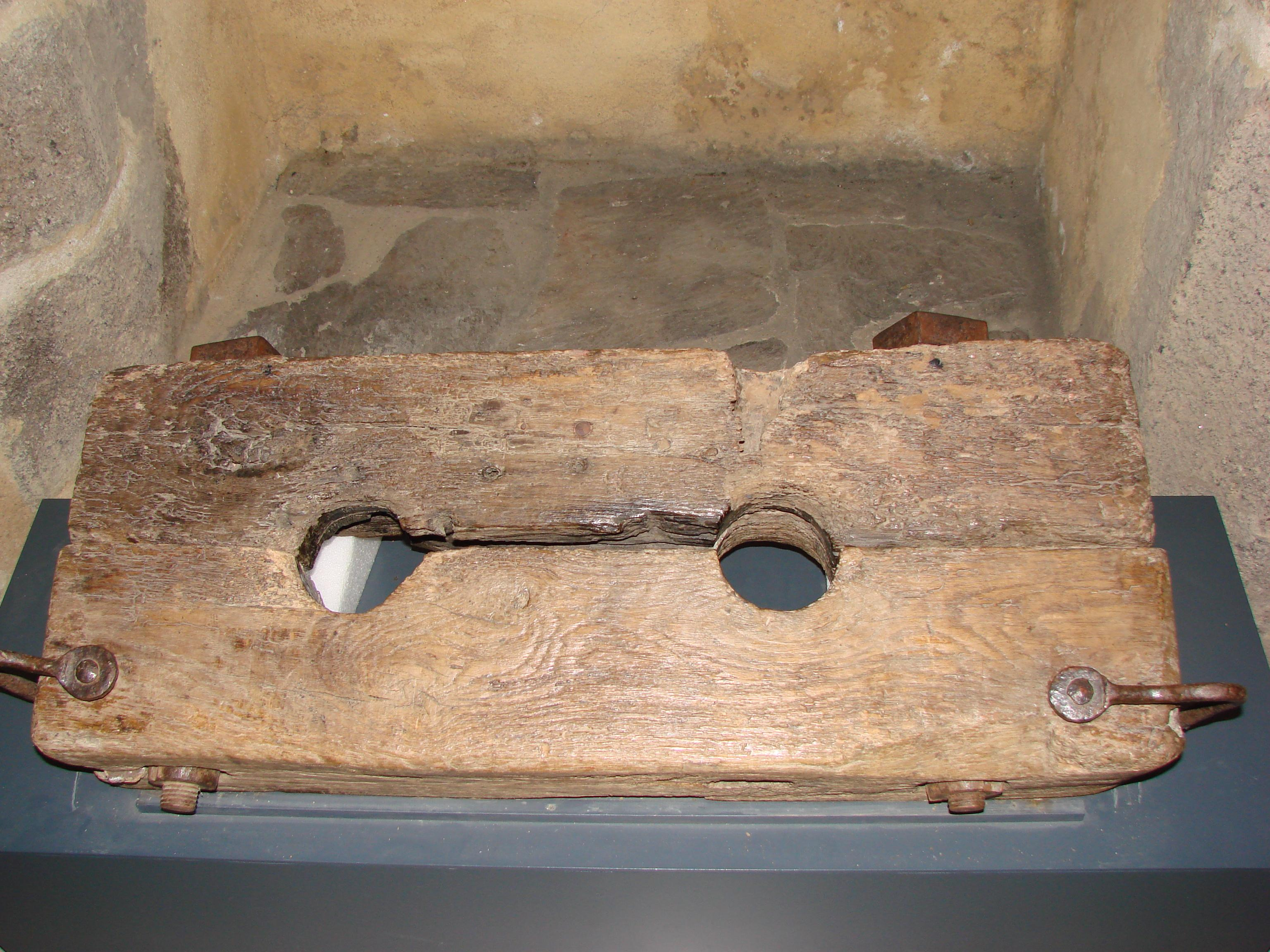
Wooden Stocks exhibited in the Musée national de la Marine.

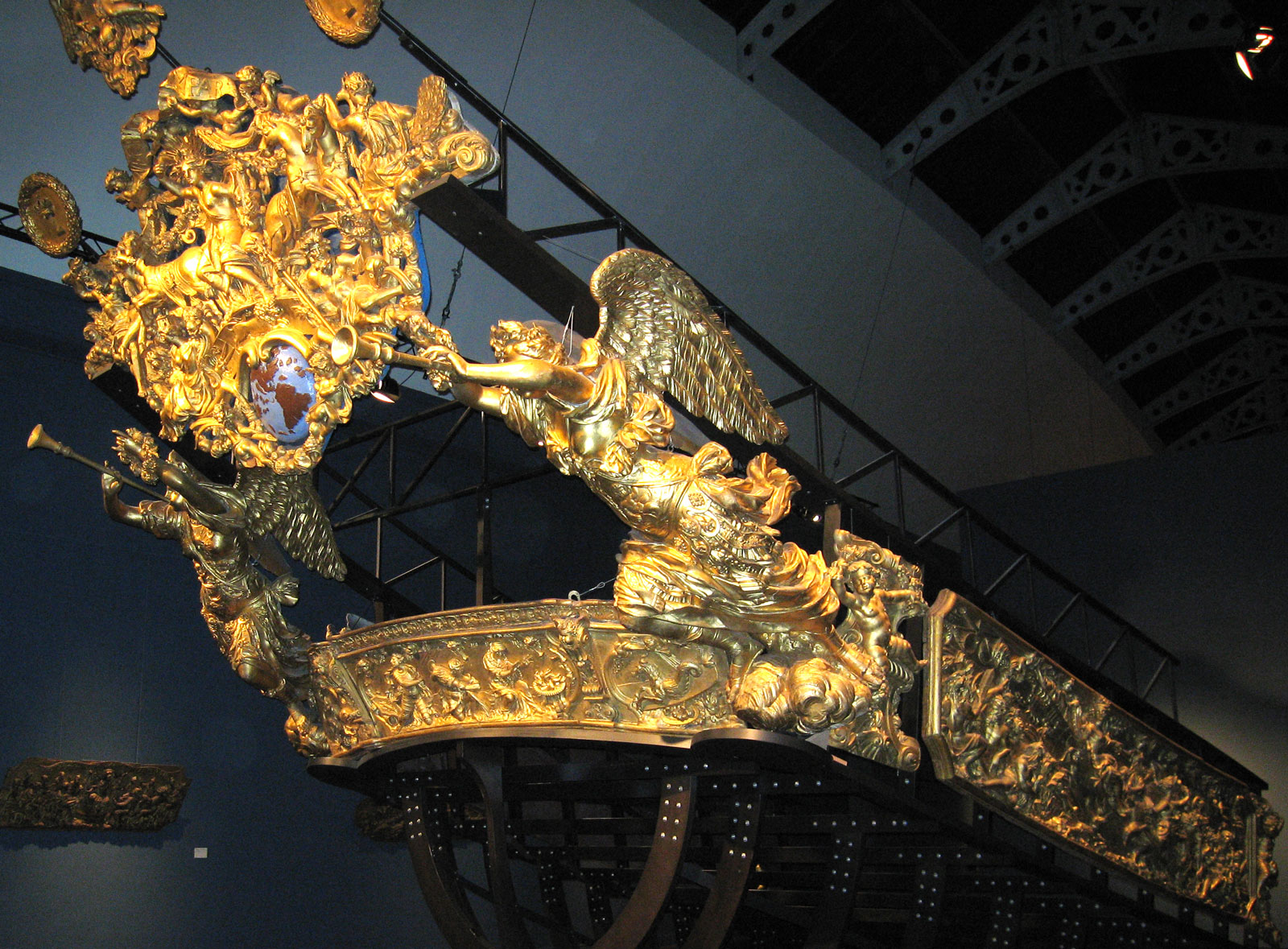
Stern decoration of the Galley Réale.

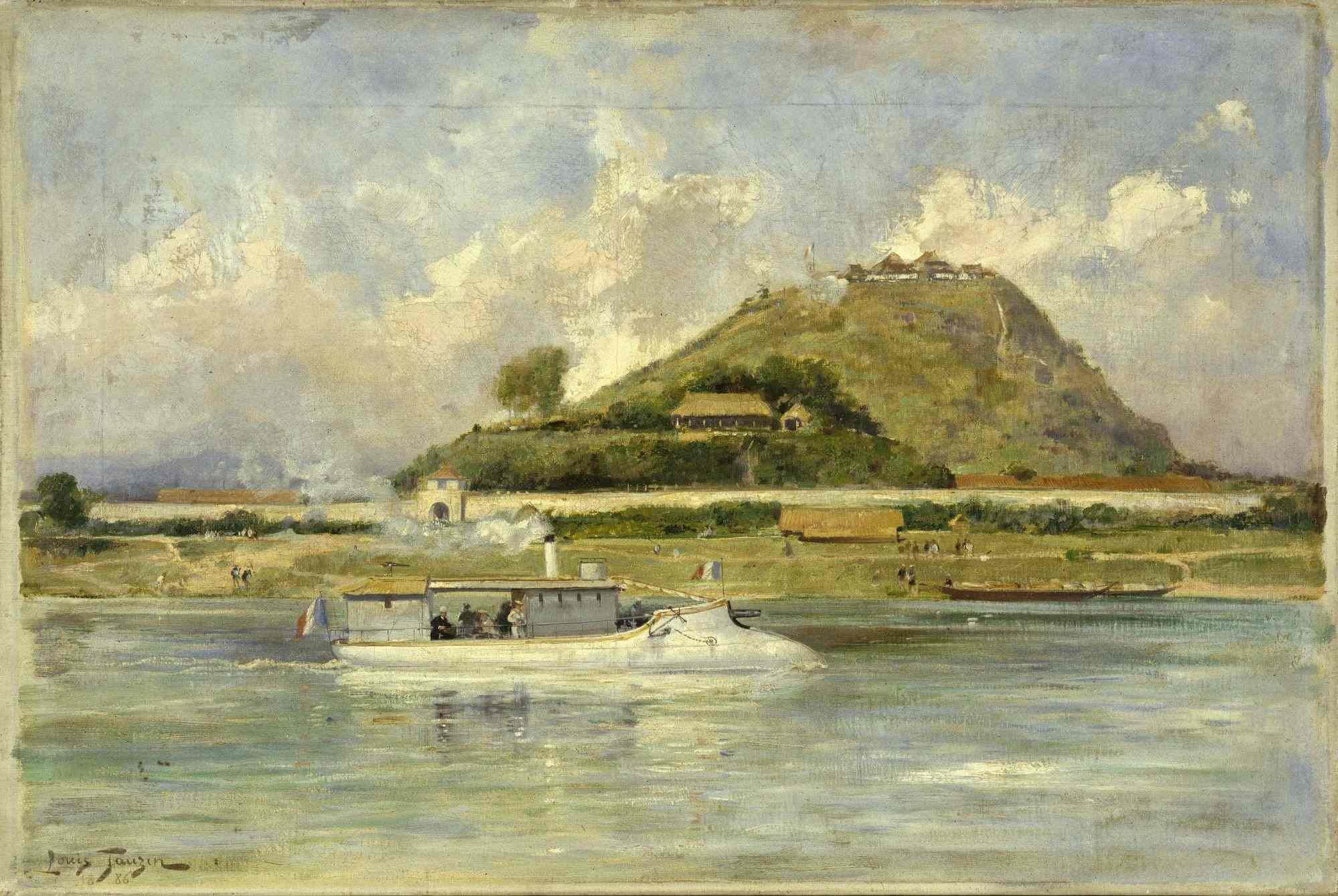
Louis Tauzin, Mitrailleuse, canonnière type Farcy, devant Tuyen Quan, 1886.

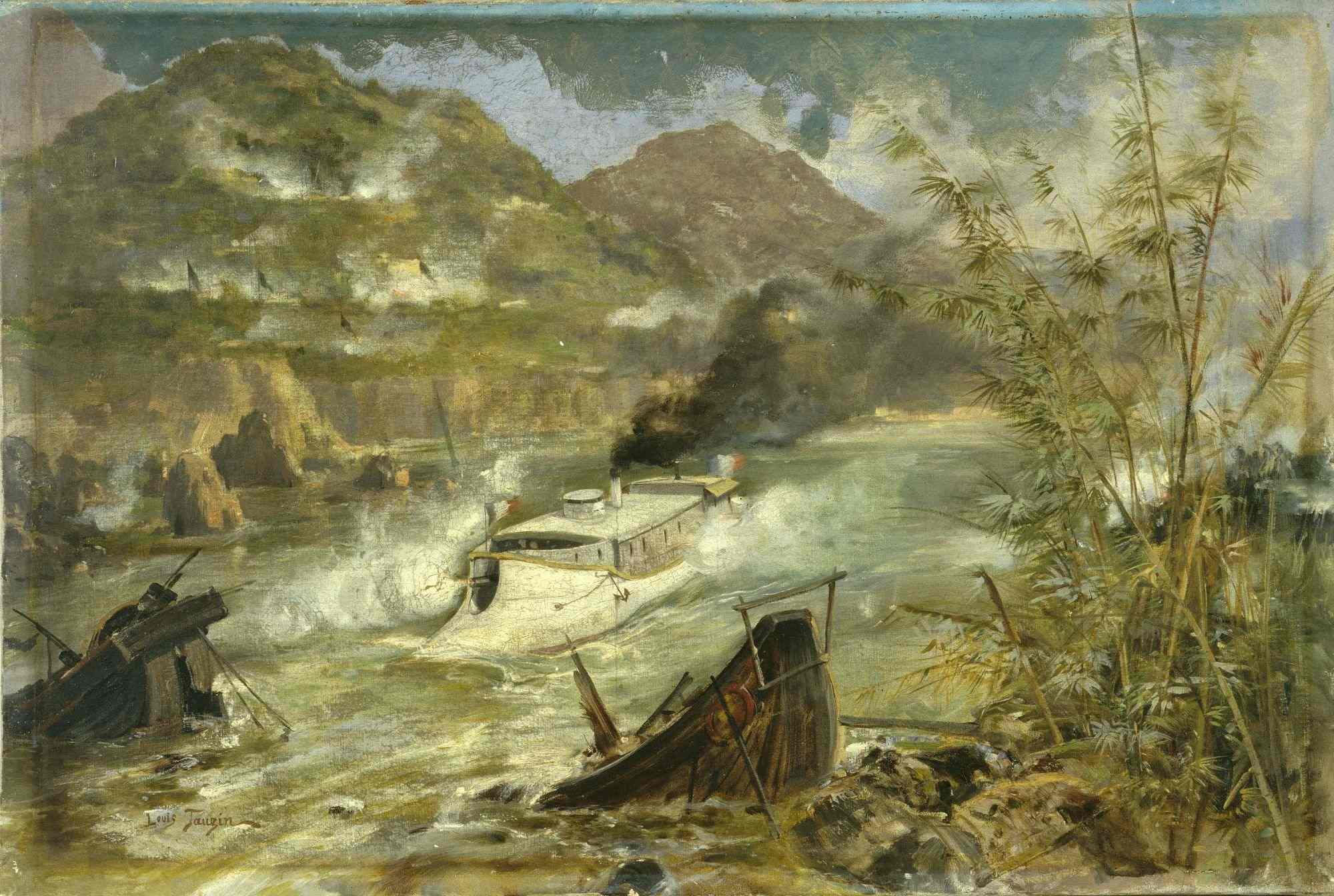
Louis Tauzin, Revolver, canonnière type Farcy, au rapide de Yuoc, 1886.

== Renovation ==
Beginning in 2017, the Museum was closed for extensive renovations. According to the museum's website, "the ambition is to make this new museum the great place of the sea and sailors in Paris." The redesigned and renovated museum opened in October 2023.

== See also ==
- List of museums in Paris
- French ship Louis Quinze
- Salon de la Marine
