= HMS Audacious (S122) =

Astute-class nuclear-powered attack submarine of the Royal Navy

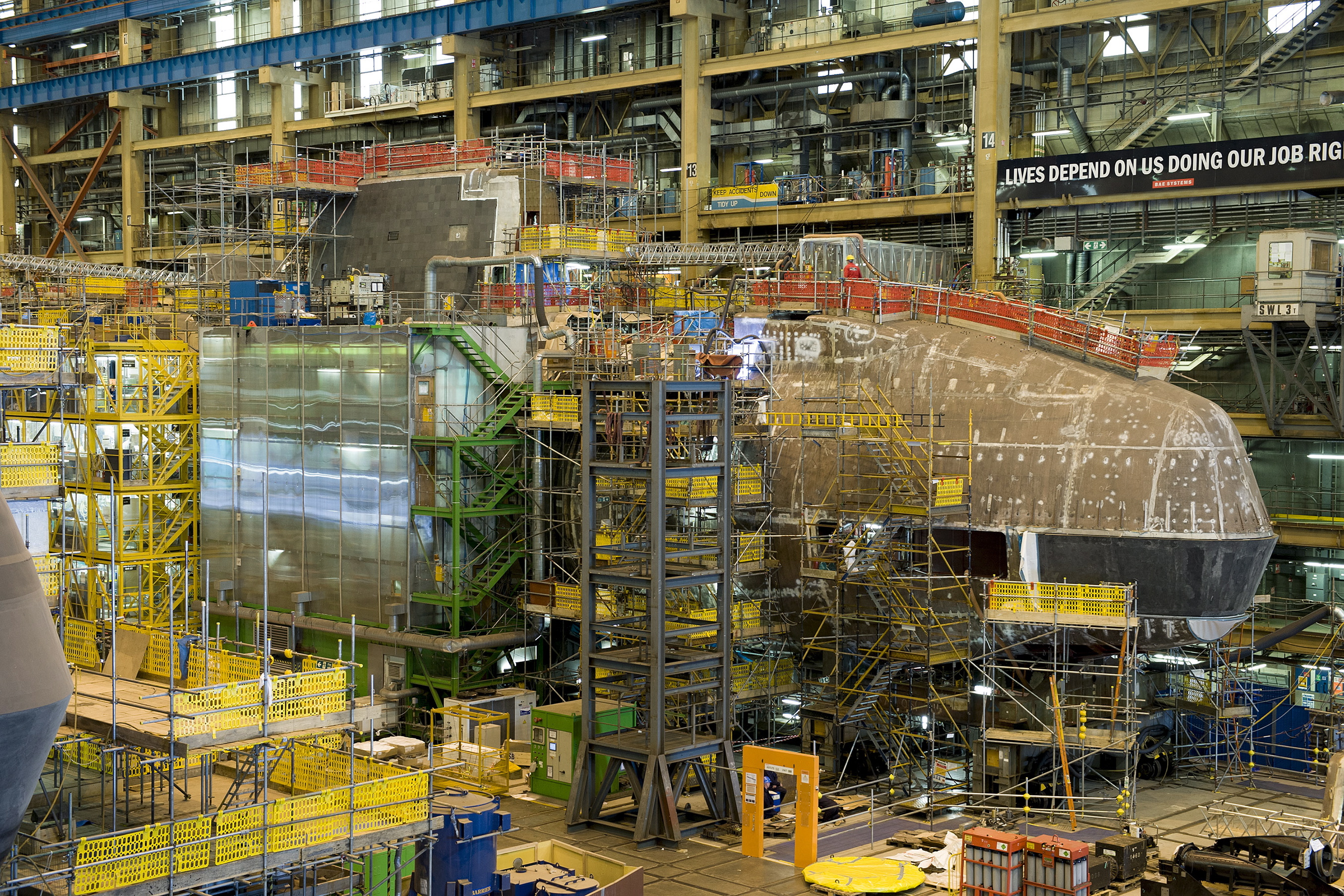
- Audacious under construction in Barrow-in-Furness in July 2013

History

United Kingdom
- Name: HMS Audacious
- Ordered: May 2007
- Builder: BAE Systems Submarine Solutions
- Cost: £1.492B (budget)
- Laid down: 24 March 2009
- Launched: 28 April 2017
- Sponsored by: Lady Elizabeth Jones
- Christened: 16 December 2016
- Commissioned: 23 September 2021
- In service: 24 September 2021
- Identification: Pennant number: S122
- Nickname(s): "The Fighting Clam"
- Status: In active service
- Badge

General characteristics
- Class & type: Astute-class fleet submarine
- Displacement: Surfaced: 7,000 to 7,400 t (6,900 to 7,300 long tons); Submerged: 7,400 to 7,800 t (7,300 to 7,700 long tons)
- Length: 97 m (318 ft 3 in)
- Beam: 11.3 m (37 ft 1 in)
- Draught: 10 m (32 ft 10 in)
- Propulsion: 1 × Rolls-Royce PWR 2 nuclear reactor, HEU 93.5%; MTU 600 kilowatt diesel generators
- Speed: 30 kn (56 km/h; 35 mph), submerged
- Range: Unlimited
- Endurance: 90 days
- Test depth: Over 300 m (984 ft 3 in)
- Complement: 98 (capacity for 109)
- Sensors & processing systems: Thales Sonar 2076; Atlas DESO 25 echosounder; 2 × Thales CM010 optronic masts; Raytheon Successor IFF
- Armament: 6 × 21 in (533 mm) torpedo tubes with stowage for up to 38 weapons: Tomahawk Block IV cruise missiles; Spearfish heavyweight torpedoes

HMS Audacious is the fourth Astute-class nuclear-powered fleet submarine of the Royal Navy. Several previous vessels of the Royal Navy have borne the name. She was formally named on 16 December 2016 and was launched on 28 April 2017. Audacious was stated to be handed over in January 2021. A parliamentary written answer stated that Audacious was commissioned on 3 April 2020, but her public ceremonial commissioning took place on 23 September 2021.

== Design ==
=== Propulsion ===
Audacious's nuclear reactor will not need to be refuelled during the boat's 25-year service. The submarine can purify water and air, and will be able to circumnavigate the planet without surfacing. However, she carries three months' supply of food for 98 officers and ratings.

=== Weapons ===
Audacious has provision for up-to 38 weapons in six 21-inch (533 mm) torpedo tubes. The submarine is capable of firing Tomahawk Block IV land-attack missiles with a range of 1,000 miles (1,600 kilometres) and Spearfish heavyweight torpedoes.

== History ==
Long lead items for her construction were ordered on 28 August 2006, although the actual order was not placed until 21 May 2007. Launch was expected in the fourth quarter of 2016, and the submarine was due to leave the yard in 2017. She was eventually formally named on 16 December 2016, and floated out on 28 April 2017, and was due to leave in 2018 for sea trials. The original budget was £1.279b but by 2015 this had risen to £1.492b.

The submarine and its crew have formally forged links with the City of Leeds (which had previously had an association with HMS Ark Royal) by meeting the people at Elland Road in the city and marching in the Armistice Day parade in November 2016.

Audacious completed her first dive at Devonshire Dock over two days in January 2018. She eventually sailed from Barrow on 4 April 2020, and commenced sea trials on 6 April 2020. A parliamentary written answer stated that Audacious was commissioned on 3 April 2020, but she was ceremonially commissioned on 23 September 2021.

In the first half of 2022, the submarine operated in tandem with NATO forces in the eastern Mediterranean. She was again reported in the eastern Mediterranean in early 2023, including stopping for a rest and maintenance period in Limassol Cyprus. In April 2023 Audacious completed a 363 day deployment, the longest ever for any Astute-class, and returned to Devonport and then Faslane. Owing to a lack of dry dock facilities pending maintenance work, as of August 2024 Audacious was still alongside in Devonport, having been inactive for 16 months.
