= HMS Audacious =

Several ships of the British Royal Navy have been named HMS Audacious.

- HMS Audacious (1785) was a 74-gun third rate in service from 1785 to 1815.
- HMS Audacious (1869) was an Audacious-class battleship, launched in 1869, converted to a depot ship in 1902, later named Fisgard then Imperieuse, and sold for breakup in 1927.
- HMS Audacious was launched in 1897 as the cargo liner SS Montcalm and changed names multiple time, becoming HMS Audacious when she was a dummy warship between 1914 and 1916, and SS Polar Chief.
- HMS Audacious (1912) was a King George V-class dreadnought battleship, launched in 1912 and sunk by a naval mine in October 1914.
- HMS Audacious was the original name of the lead ship of the Audacious class of aircraft carrier. The ship was renamed as HMS Eagle on 21 January 1946, two months before her launch.
- HMS Audacious (S122) is an Astute-class submarine, launched on 28 April 2017 and commissioned on 3 April 2020.

A 14-gun sloop that HMS Magnanime captured from France in 1798, Audacieux, was commissioned into the Royal Navy as HMS Audacieux.

== See also ==
- HMS Audacity
