= Pierre-Jacques-Nicolas Rolland =

Baron Pierre-Jacques-Nicolas Rolland (17 June 1769 – 9 December 1837) was a French naval architect and engineer.

Pierre-Jacques-Nicolas Rolland was born on 17 June 1769 in the harbour town of Brest, into the family of Pierre Nicolas Rolland, engineer-constructor of the Brest Port. He followed his father's footsteps and in 1785, at the age of 16 entered the service at Rochefort Port.

In 1795 he fought the British fleet at the naval battle of Genoa on board the French ship Sans Culotte. (Note: Better known as Orient, as she was named at the Battle of the Nile) Ten years later he was already an established engineer and shortly thereafter chief engineer. In 1802 the launching (under his direction) of two major ships, the République-Française and the Magnanime, drew the attention of Denis Decrès, Minister of the Navy, and of Napoléon Bonaparte himself to the young engineer. In 1808, Bonaparte visited Rochefort's naval dockyard and was highly satisfied with Rolland's work there. He therefore ordered him to relocate his office to Paris as shipwright advisor and awarded him the title of "lieutenant-general-inspector of Naval Engineers". In 1811 he was assigned to go from France to the Kingdom of Holland in order to compare shipbuilding methods between these two countries. In 1817, Rolland became a close collaborator to Jacques-Noël Sané, and co-authored plans of 18-pounder frigates with him. He is notable credited for the Armide class. Rolland rose to general inspector of naval constructions ("inspecteur général du génie maritime") during the Bourbon Restoration, and took part in the Commission de Paris.

In 1825 he was elevated by King Charles X to the rank of Baron. Pierre-Jacques-Nicolas Rolland died in Paris on 9 December 1837.

He was awarded Order of Saint Michael and the Order of Saint-Louis in 1817, and Commander of the Legion of Honour in 1831.
