= List of French Navy ship names =

This is an alphabetical list of the names of all ships that have been in service with the French Navy. Names are traditionally re-used over the years, and have been carried by more than one ship.

== List of ships ==
=== A ===
- Achéron
- Achille
- Aconit
- Admirable
- Africain
- Africaine
- Aigle
- Aisne
- Alexandre
- Algérien
- Algésiras
- Amarante
- Amazone
- Ambitieux
- America
- Amiral Charner
- Amphitrite
- Andromaque
- Annibal
- Apollon
- Aquilon
- Aquitaine
- Arabe
- Aréthuse
- Argonaute
- Ariane
- Armide
- Arromanches
- Artémis
- Artémise
- Astrée
- Astrolabe
- Atalante
- Atlas
- Audacieux
- Auguste

=== B ===
- Bison
- Borda
- Boudeuse
- Bougainville
- Bouvet

=== C ===
- Capricieuse
- Casabianca
- Cassard
- Cassiopée
- Chacal
- Champlain
- Charles Plumier
- Chasseloup-Laubat
- Châteaurenault
- Colbert
- Courbet

=== D ===
- D'Entrecasteaux
- D'Estrées
- D'Estienne d'Orves
- De Grasse
- Dumont d'Urville
- Dunkerque
- Duguay-Trouin
- Dupérré
- Dupetit-Thouars
- Dupleix
- Dupuy de Lôme
- Duquesne
- Durance

=== E ===
- Églantine
- Élan
- Émile Bertin
- Épée
- Espadon
- Estérel
- Éclaireur
- Étoile

=== F ===
- Forbin
- Foudre
- Fougueuse
- Francis Garnier

=== G ===
- Gapeau
- Garonne
- Gazelle
- Georges Leygues
- Glaive
- Glorieuse
- Gracieuse
- Guénon
- Guépard
- Guépratte

=== H ===
- Hache
- Hamelin
- Hallebarde
- Henri Poincaré

=== I ===
- Indomptable
- Inflexible

=== J ===
- Jacques Cartier
- Jaguar
- Jauréguiberry
- Jean Bart
- Jean de Vienne
- Jeanne d'Arc
- Jules Verne

=== K ===
- Kersaint

=== L ===
- L'Audacieux
- La Fayette
- La Galissonnière
- La Grandière
- La Hermitte
- La Motte-Picquet
- La Saône
- La Seine
- Lapérouse
- Laplace
- Latouche-Tréville
- Le Fantasque
- Léopard
- Limier
- Lion
- Loire
- Luberon
- Lynx
- Lyre

=== M ===
- Maillé-Brézé
- Marne
- Massue
- Méduse
- Mercure
- Meuse
- Milan
- Mistral
- Molène
- Monge
- Montcalm
- Moqueuse
- Mutin

=== N ===
- Normand

=== O ===
- Oise
- Orage
- Orion
- Ouragan

=== P ===
- Panthère
- Pégase
- Persévérante
- Pluton
- Poseïdon
- Primauguet

=== R ===
- Rapière
- Railleuse
- Reddition
- Redoutable
- Renommée
- Richelieu
- Rieuse
- Roland

=== S ===
- Sabre
- Siroco
- Somme
- Strasbourg
- Styx
- Surcouf

=== T ===
- Tapageuse
- Tenace
- Téméraire
- Terrible
- Tigre
- Tonnant
- Tourville
- Triomphant

=== V ===
- Var
- Vauquelin
- Victor Schoelcher
- Vigilant
- Volta
- Vulcain

=== Y ===
- Yser

== See also ==
- List of Royal Navy ship names
