= HMS Gibraltar =

Seven ships of the British Royal Navy have been named HMS Gibraltar, after the British overseas territory of Gibraltar.

- The first HMS Gibraltar (1711) was a 20-gun sixth rate built in 1711, rebuilt in 1727, and sold in 1748. It was the first command of John Byng, who was afterwards to be court-martialled and executed in the opening stages of the Seven Years' War.
- The second HMS Gibraltar (1754) was a 20-gun sixth rate in service from 1754 to 1773.
- The third HMS Gibraltar (1779) was an American 14-gun brig captured in 1779, then in turn captured by the Spanish in 1781.
- The fourth HMS Gibraltar (1780) was the 80-gun Spanish Fénix captured at the Battle of Cape St. Vincent in 1780, used as a powder hulk in 1813 and broken up in 1836.
- The fifth HMS Gibraltar was a 101-gun screw first rate launched in 1860, on loan as a training ship in 1872, renamed Grampian in 1889, and sold in 1899.
- The sixth HMS Gibraltar (1892) was an Edgar-class cruiser launched in 1892, made into a depot ship in 1912, and sold in 1923.
- The seventh HMS Gibraltar (D68) was to have been a Malta-class aircraft carrier, ordered from Vickers Armstrong on 15 September 1943, but cancelled in October 1945.

== See also ==
- HMS Gibraltar Prize
