= Africaine (disambiguation) =

Africaine is a 1981 album of 1959 recordings by Art Blakey.

Africaine (French "African woman") may also refer to:

- L'Africaine (The African Woman), a grand opera by Meyerbeer
- Africaine (cigarette), a Luxembourgish brand
- HMS Africaine, two ships of the Royal Navy
- French ship Africaine, several French ships
- Africaine (ship), several ships
