= Arabe =

Arabe ('Arabic' or 'Arab' in French) or Árabe (in Spanish and Portuguese) may refer to:

- French ship Arabe, several ships with the name
- C.D. Árabe Unido, a Panamanian football club
- Cristhian Árabe, Bolivian footballer

== See also ==
- El árabe, a Mexican telenovela
- Arab (disambiguation)
- Arrabe (disambiguation)
