= Medusa (disambiguation) =

Medusa is one of the three Gorgons in Greek mythology.

Medusa may also refer to:

== Art and entertainment ==
=== Fictional characters ===
- Medusa, a Soul Eater character
- Medusa, a Kamen Rider Wizard character
- Medusa, a military unit in the Jason Bourne novel series
- Medusa, a planet in the TV series Star Maidens
- Madame Medusa, a character in The Rescuers
- Medusae, an alien race in the novel The Legion of Space
- Medusa, an antagonist in the Japanese manga Rosario + Vampire
- Rider, a Fate/stay night character
- Medusa (DC Comics), a comic book character from DC Comics
- Medusa (Marvel Comics), a comic book character from Marvel Comics
- Medusa, a character in the Kid Icarus game series
- Medusa, a monster in the Eggerland game series
- Dusa, a disembodied gorgon head in the video game Hades

=== Film and TV ===
- Medusa, a 1973 film starring George Hamilton and Cameron Mitchell
- Medusa Film, a film production company owned by Mediaset
- Medusa: Dare to Be Truthful, a mockumentary film
- "Medusa" (Supergirl), a season 2 episode of the TV series
- "Medusa" (The X-Files), twelfth episode of season 8 of the TV series

=== Literature ===
- Medusa, a 1988 novel by Hammond Innes
- Medusa, a 2004 novel by Thomas Thiemeyer
- Medusa (Cussler novel), a 2009 novel by Clive Cussler and Paul Kemprecos
- Medusa (Dibdin novel), a 2003 novel by Michael Dibdin
- Medusa, and Other Poems, by Lady Charlotte Elliot (1878)
- "Medusa", a poem by Louise Bogan
- Medusa: A Tiger by the Tail, a 1983 novel by Jack L. Chalker

=== Music ===
- Medusa, a female rap artist affiliated with the open-mic workshop Project Blowed
- Medusa (band), a punk-influenced rock band from the UK
- Medusa (Annie Lennox album), 1995
- Medusa (Clan of Xymox album), 1986
- Medusa (Paradise Lost album), 2017
- Medusa (Trapeze album), 1970
- The Medusa, an album by New Zealand rock band Tadpole, 2002
- "Medusa" (Jhayco, Anuel AA and J Balvin song), 2020
- "Medusa" (Cameron Whitcomb song), 2024
- "Medusa", a song by Anthrax from Spreading the Disease, 1985
- "Medusa", a song by Jolin Tsai from Play, 2014
- "Medusa", a song by Psyopus from Odd Senses, 2009
- "Medusa", a song by Sweet from Desolation Boulevard, 1974
- "Medusa", a song by Times of Grace from Songs of Loss and Separation, 2021
- "The Medusa", a song by The Haunted from The Dead Eye, 2006
- "Medusa (Stone)", a song by Theory of a Deadman from Dinosaur, 2023

=== Paintings ===
- Medusa (Caravaggio), a painting by Michelangelo Merisi da Caravaggio, produced in two versions in 1596 and ca. 1597
- Medusa (Leonardo), either of two early paintings by Leonardo da Vinci

== Places ==
- Medousa, Xanthi, Greece
- Medusa, New York, United States
- Medusa Lake, another name for Lake Natron, Tanzania
- Medusa Lake (Antarctica)

== Astronomy ==
- Medusa Nebula, a planetary nebula in the constellation of Gemini
- Medusa Galaxy Merger (NGC 4194), pair of interacting galaxies in the constellation Ursa Major
- 149 Medusa, an asteroid

== Ships ==
- HMS Medusa, various ships of the Royal Navy
- Italian submarine Medusa, several submarines of the Italian Navy
- SMS Medusa, a Gazelle-class light cruiser of the Imperial German Navy
- USS Medusa, various ships of the United States Navy

== Roller coasters ==
- Medusa (Six Flags Discovery Kingdom), a steel floorless roller coaster
- Medusa (Six Flags Great Adventure), steel floorless roller coaster
- Medusa Steel Coaster, a hybrid roller coaster in Six Flags México

== Plants and animals ==
- Medusa, a phase in the life cycle of jellyfish
  - Medusozoa
- Medusa pepper, a Capsicum annuum cultivar
- Medusa orchid, an orchid with snake-like tendrils.

== Other uses ==
- Medusa (mythology), the name of several other figures from Greek mythology
- MEDUSA, a proposed type of nuclear pulse propulsion for interplanetary and interstellar space travel
- MEDUSA4, a design software program
- MEDUSA (weapon), a non-lethal directed-energy weapon
- Medusa piercing, an alternative term for philtrum piercing
- Operation Medusa, a 2006 military operation in Afghanistan

== See also ==
- Madusa, stage name of professional wrestler Debrah Miceli (born 1964)
- Méduse (disambiguation)
- Meduza (disambiguation)
