= Marne =

Marne can refer to:

== Places ==
=== France ===
- Marne (river), a tributary of the Seine
- Marne (department), a département in northeastern France named after the river
- La Marne, a commune in western France
- Marne, a legislative constituency (France)

=== Netherlands ===
- De Marne, a municipality in Groningen, the Netherlands
- Marne tram stop in Amstelveen, the Netherlands

=== United States ===
- Marne, Iowa, a small city
- Marne, Michigan, an unincorporated community
- Marne, Ohio, a census-designated place
- Marne, West Virginia, an unincorporated community

=== Other ===
- Marne, Germany, a town in Schleswig-Holstein
- Marne (Italy), frazione in the commune of Filago
- Marne River (South Australia)

== Military uses ==
=== Military actions ===
- First Battle of the Marne, 1914, one of the bloodiest battles of World War I
- Second Battle of the Marne, 1918, an Allied victory during World War I
- Operation Marne, a 2004 Iraq War counterinsurgency operation

=== Ships ===
- HMS Marne, two Royal Navy destroyers
- French ship Marne, a number of French Navy vessels

=== Other ===
- Marne Barracks, a former Royal Air Force base in Yorkshire, England

== People ==
- Marino Marne Intrieri (1907–1969), American football player
- Marne Levine (born 1971/72), American businesswoman
- Marne Maitland (1920–1991), Anglo-Indian actor
- Marnette Patterson (born 1980), American actress
- Jean-Louis de Marne (1752–1829), French painter
- Marius Mârne (born 1977), Romanian football player

== See also ==
- Marna (disambiguation)
- Marnes (disambiguation)
