= List of ships named Africaine =

Several vessels have been named Africaine:

- USS Herald was built at Newburyport, Massachusetts, possibly in 1797. The US Navy purchased her in 1798, and sold her in 1801. She became the French 20-gun privateer corvette Africaine. In 1804 a British privateer seized her on 4 May 1804 at Charleston, South Carolina. The seizure gave rise to a case in the U.S. courts that defined the limits of U.S. territorial waters. The U.S. courts ruled that the privateer had seized Africaine outside U.S. jurisdiction. Africaine then became a Liverpool-based slave ship that made two voyages carrying slaves from West Africa to the West Indies. After the abolition of the slave trade in 1807 she became a West Indiaman that two French privateers captured in late 1807 or early 1808.
- Dutch ship Minerva (1787) was launched in 1787 at Veere for the navy of the Dutch Republic. In 1799 the Royal Navy captured her. She became HMS Braak, but the Navy sold her with the arrival of the Peace of Amiens. Daniel Bennet purchased her and she became the whaler Africaine (or African or Africa). She made two whaling voyages.
- Africaine (1832 ship) was a barque launched in 1831 at Jarrow on the River Tyne in England. In 1836 she carried immigrants as part of the First Fleet of South Australia. She was wrecked on 23 September 1843.

== See also ==
- HMS Africaine – one of two ships of the British Royal Navy by that name
- French ship Africaine – several ships of that name in the French Navy
- French ship Africain
