= French ship Armide =

At least four ships of the French Navy have been named Armide:

- French frigate Armide (1804), lead ship of the Armide-class frigate launched in 1804 and captured by Great Britain in 1806
- French frigate Armide (1821), a Pallas-class frigate
- French ironclad Armide, an Alma-class ironclad launched in 1867 and expended as a target in 1886
- French submarine Armide, lead ship of the Armide-class submarine launched in 1915 and stricken in 1932
