= Armide =

Armide is the French and English form of the name Armida, a sorceress in Tasso's Gerusalemme liberata, after whom are also named:

- Armide (Lully), an opera by Jean-Baptiste Lully
- Armide (Gluck), an opera by Christoph Willibald Gluck
- Le Pavillon d'Armide, ballet by Fokine
- French submarine Armide, a submarine constructed during World War I
- Armide (ship), a French frigate
  - Armide-class frigate

See also Armida#In_opera
