= Aquitania (disambiguation) =

Aquitania may refer to:

- Gallia Aquitania, a region of Gaul inhabited by the Aquitani, a people living in Gallo-Roman times in what is now Aquitaine, France
- Aquitaine, a region of France roughly between the Pyrenees, the Atlantic Ocean and the Garonne, also a former kingdom and duchy
- 387 Aquitania, a fairly large main belt asteroid
- Aquitania, Boyacá, Colombia
- RMS Aquitania, a Cunard Line ocean liner
- The Aquitania, a luxury, cooperative apartment in Chicago, Illinois
- British Rail Class 40 diesel locomotive D215, built by English Electric at Newton-le-Willows, Lancashire

== See also ==
- Aquitaine (disambiguation)
- Via Aquitania
