= Espada =

Espada or espadas may refer to: "espada" means "sword" or "blade".

== Entertainment ==
- Espadas, one of the four suits of Spanish playing cards
- Espada, a character in Don Quixote (ballet)
- Espada (Bleach), a faction of characters in the anime series Bleach
- Granado Espada, Korean fantasy video game
- Espada, a tribe in Survivor: Nicaragua

== People ==
- Ángel Espada (born 1948), Puerto Rican boxer
- Edu Espada (born 1981), Spanish footballer
- Frank Espada (1930–2014), American photojournalist and activist
- Guty Espadas (born 1954), Mexican boxer
- Guty Espadas Jr. (born 1974), Mexican boxer
- Ibán Espadas (born 1978), Spanish footballer
- Joe Espada (born 1975), Puerto Rican baseball player and coach
- Juan Espadas (born 1966), Spanish politician, Mayor of Seville
- Martín Espada (born 1957), American poet
- Pedro Espada Jr. (born 1953), American politician
- Rafael Espada (born 1944), former Vice President of Guatemala

== Places ==
- Espada Cemetery, Havana, Cuba
- Mission Espada, Catholic mission established in 1690 in Texas
- Rancho La Espada, ranch in California
- Espada Formation, rock formation in California
- Espadas Peak, mountain on the Spanish side of the Pyrenees
- La Espada, a mountain in Chile
- Serra d'Espadà, mountain range in Castellón, Spain

== Other uses ==
- A sword, especially the Spanish espada ropera
- Lamborghini Espada, an Italian car produced between 1968 and 1978
- USS Espada (SS-355), American submarine whose construction was cancelled
- The Portuguese name for a black scabbardfish
- Severe Tropical Storm Noguri (2002) (T0204, 07W, Espada) – a typhoon in the 2002 Pacific typhoon season named Espada by PAGASA
- A model of electric guitar introduced by Balaguer Guitars in 2018
- A separate model of electric guitar introduced by G&L Musical Instruments in 2019

== See also ==
- Espadon (disambiguation)
- Spada (disambiguation)
