= Dupleix =

Dupleix could refer to one of the following:

People:

- Jill Dupleix (born 1961), Australian food writer
- Joseph François Dupleix, governor general of the French establishment in India in the 18th century

Naval ships:

- French corvette Dupleix (1861) (1856–1887) famous for her involvement in the Japanese revolution
- French ship Dupleix, a 7700 tonne armoured cruiser (1897–1919): built in Rochefort and launched on 28 April 1900
- French cruiser Dupleix, French heavy cruiser of the Suffren class, launched 9 October 1930
- Dupleix (D 641), the latest Dupleixis a F70 typ anti-submarine frigate

Commercial ships:

- a steamship built at La Ciotat in 1862, which between 1883 and 1888 operated between Sydney and Nouméa, was sold, refurbished and subsequently operated between Australia and New Zealand.
- a three-masted barque (1901–1917) sunk by the German commerce raider Seeadler on 5 March 1917
- a cargo ship (1914–1942) sunk in the Pacific by a Japanese submarine.

In transport:

- Dupleix station, a Paris Metro station in the 15th arrondissement of Paris
