= French ship Amazone =

Fifteen ships of the French Navy have borne the name Amazone ("Amazon"):

== Ships named Amazone ==
- Amazone (1675), a galley .
- Amazone (1686), a galley.
- Amazone (1702), an Ambitieuse class ordinary galley.
- Amazone (1705), a 38-gun frigate.
- Amazone (1707), a 36-gun frigate.
- Amazone (1751), a galley .
- Amazone (1778), a 32-gun Iphigénie-class frigate .
- Amazone (1793), a tartane.
- Amazone (1807), a 40-gun Junon-class frigate .
- Amazone (1821), a 52-gun frigate .
- Amazone (1831), a frigate captured from Portugal during the Battle of the Tagus.
- Amazone (1858), a steam and sail transport.
- Amazone (1916), an Armide-class submarine launched in 1916 and stricken in 1932.
- Amazone (1931) a Diane-class submarine launched in 1931 and stricken in 1946.
- Amazone (S639), an Aréthuse-class submarine launched in 1958 and stricken in 1980.

== Ships with similar names ==
- Amazone II (1914), an auxiliary cruiser .
