= Micro Fleet: World War I =

Naval miniature wargame

- Publishers: Tabletop Games
- Publication: 1976
- Genres: WWI naval combat

Micro Fleet: World War I is a naval wargame published by Tabletop Games in 1976 that was designed to introduce new players to wargames.

== Description ==
Micro Fleet: World War I is a two-player wargame that simulates naval combat during World War I.

The game is played on any flat surface, the ships depicted by cardboard counters. The rules provide scale so that distances between ships can be determined by a ruler. Cards for twenty-three ships of the era provide statistics about speed, manoeuvrability, firing arcs, etc.

The game rules are relatively simple: The player use their order sheets to define the course their ship take. When in range, one ship fires at the other. Once range, crew competency, tactical manoeuvre, speed, target class, speed of target and a die roll are factored in, a hit or miss is determined. If it is a hit, the location is determined and any damage over the armour in that location is deducted from the target ship's overall hit points.

Optional rules are included for collisions, chain of command, signals, dud shells, smoke screens and torpedoes. Rules are also included for individual ship-to-ship combat and fleet actions.

The ships included in the game are:

=== British ===
- HMS Invincible
- HMS Inflexible
- HMS Indefatigable
- HMS Indomitable
- HMS New Zealand
- HMS Tiger
- HMS Queen Mary
- HMS Lion
- HMS Princess Royal
- HMS Carnarvon
- HMS Glasgow
- HMS Kent
- HMS Cornwall

=== German ===
- SMS Moltke
- SMS Goeben
- SMS Seydlitz
- SMS Derfflinger
- SMS Lützow
- SMS Von der Tann
- SMS Blücher
- SMS Gneisenau
- SMS Scharnhorst
- SMS Dresden
- SMS Breslau
- SMS Leipzig
- SMS Nürnberg

These allow the players to simulate the Pursuit of Goeben and Breslau, the Battle of the Falkland Islands, the Battle of Dogger Bank and battlecruiser action at the Battle of Jutland.

Tabletop published two supplements for this game, British Jutland Set and German Jutland Set, that add cards for the other ships that were present at the Battle of Jutland.

== Publication history ==
In the mid-1970s, the British game publisher Tabletop Games released a series of compact, simple and inexpensive wargames designed to introduce new players to wargaming. Each game in the "Micro Warfare Series" included everything needed to play, although players could substitute their own military miniatures for the cardboard counters that were provided. One of the first in the series to be published was Micro Fleet: World War I in 1976. The 21-page rulebook, counters, two order pads and a combat sheet were packaged in a small 14 cm × 20 cm (5.5 in × 7.9 in) plastic box.

== Reception ==
In Issue 32 of the British wargaming magazine Perfidious Albion, Charles Vasey found that the biggest problem with the game was that shells penetrated even the thickest armour and asked "If guns can always penetrate the armour at normal ranges, does it really matter if one has 6" of armour or 11"? The only factor seems to be the number of hits you can make. This would seem to give rise to a catamaran mounting 15" guns." Despite, this, Vasey concluded, "I was impressed with the ideas of the rules. The ship cards with their plan views look very neat, and can be replaced by miniatures if you have them, but are perfectly good as they are. I do have three serious complaints about the cards however - where are the French, Italian and Austro-Hungarian sheets, eh??? Buck up your ideas, Tabletop, and get producing them."

In Issue 36 of the French games magazine Casus Belli, Philippe Allard noted, "Under the small red covers, there is a streamlined and effective set of rules ... However, this shouldn't lead you to conclude that these are simplistic versions of historical games. The realism is, on the contrary, astonishing, and those familiar with the genre will appreciate the authors' skill." Allard concluded, "The rules of this Micro Warfare series provide a pleasant introduction to miniature wargaming and stand up to comparison with other, more ambitious systems."
