= French ship Laplace =

At least three ships of the French Navy have been named Laplace:

- French submarine Laplace, a Lagrange-class submarine launched in 1919 and scrapped in 1935
- French weather ship Laplace (F-13), a Tacoma-class frigate launched in 1944, sold to the French Navy in 1947, sunk by a leftover mine in 1950
- French ship Laplace (A 793), a Lapérouse-class survey ship launched in 1988
