= Méduse =

Méduse is the French name for Medusa, a monster in Greek mythology, and the French word for a jellyfish.

Méduse also may refer to:

- French ship Méduse, various ships of the French Navy, including the 1810 frigate Méduse, of Raft of the Medusa fame.
- Méduse (opera), a 1697 opera by the French composer Charles-Hubert Gervais
- Méduse (cooperative), a cooperative of artistic, cultural, and community-based producers and disseminators in Quebec, Canada
- Le Radeau de la Méduse (The Raft of the Medusa)), a painting by Théodore Géricault
- Le Radeau de la Méduse, a 1994 French film

== See also ==
- Medusa (disambiguation)
