= Jaureguiberry =

The name Jaureguiberry can refer to:

Geography

- Jaureguiberry, a seaside resort in Uruguay

People

- Bernard Jauréguiberry, French admiral

Sports

- Palais des sports Jauréguiberry, an indoor sporting arena in Toulon, France

Ships

- French ship Jauréguiberry, two ships that served in the French Navy.
