= Boudeuse =

Boudeuse or La Boudeuse may refer to:

- Boudeuse Cay, Seychelles
- French ship Boudeuse, several ships
- La Boudeuse (painting), by Antoine Watteau
