= Audacious-class aircraft carrier =

Royal Navy aircraft carrier class

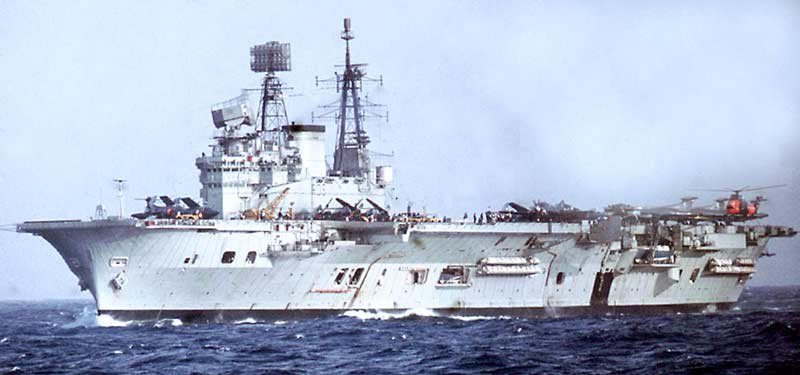
- HMS Eagle

Class overview
- Name: Audacious class
- Operators: Royal Navy
- Preceded by: Implacable class
- Succeeded by: Malta class (cancelled); CVA-01 (cancelled); Invincible class
- Planned: 4
- Completed: 2
- Canceled: 2
- Retired: 2

General characteristics
- Type: Aircraft carrier
- Displacement: 36,800 tons (as built)
- Length: 804 ft (245 m)
- Beam: Ark Royal; 112 ft (34 m) (as built); Eagle; 135 ft (41 m)
- Draught: 33 ft (10 m)
- Propulsion: 8 Admiralty 3-drum boilers in 4 boiler rooms; 4 sets of Parsons geared turbines, 4 shafts; Power: 152,000 shp (113,000 kW)
- Speed: Eagle; 32 knots (59 km/h; 37 mph); Ark Royal; 31.5 knots (58.3 km/h; 36.2 mph)
- Range: Eagle; 7,000 nmi (13,000 km; 8,100 mi) at 18 kn (33 km/h; 21 mph); Ark Royal; 7,000 nmi (13,000 km; 8,100 mi) at 14 kn (26 km/h; 16 mph); 5,000 nmi (9,300 km; 5,800 mi) at 24 kn (44 km/h; 28 mph)
- Armament: Eagle (As built:); 16 × 4.5 inch guns (8 × 2); 61 × 40 mm guns (8 × 6, 2 × 2, 9 × 1); Post-1964 re-fit: 8 × 4.5 inch guns (4 × 2); 6 × Seacat SAM missile launchers; Ark Royal (As built:); 16 × 4.5 inch guns (8 × 2); 52 × 40 mm (6 × 6, 2 × 2, 12 × 1); 1969 refit: none
- Armour: Eagle; Waterline belt: 4 in (100 mm); Armoured flight deck: 1–4 in (25–102 mm); Hangar side: 1 in (25 mm); Hangar deck: 1 in (25 mm)
- Aircraft carried: Eagle (As built:); 60; Post-1964: 45; Ark Royal (As built:); 50; 38 after 1967–1970 refit

The Audacious-class aircraft carriers were a class of aircraft carriers proposed by the British government in the 1930s – 1940s and completed after the Second World War. The two ships built were heavily modified and diverged over their service lives. They were in operation from 1951 until 1979.

== History ==
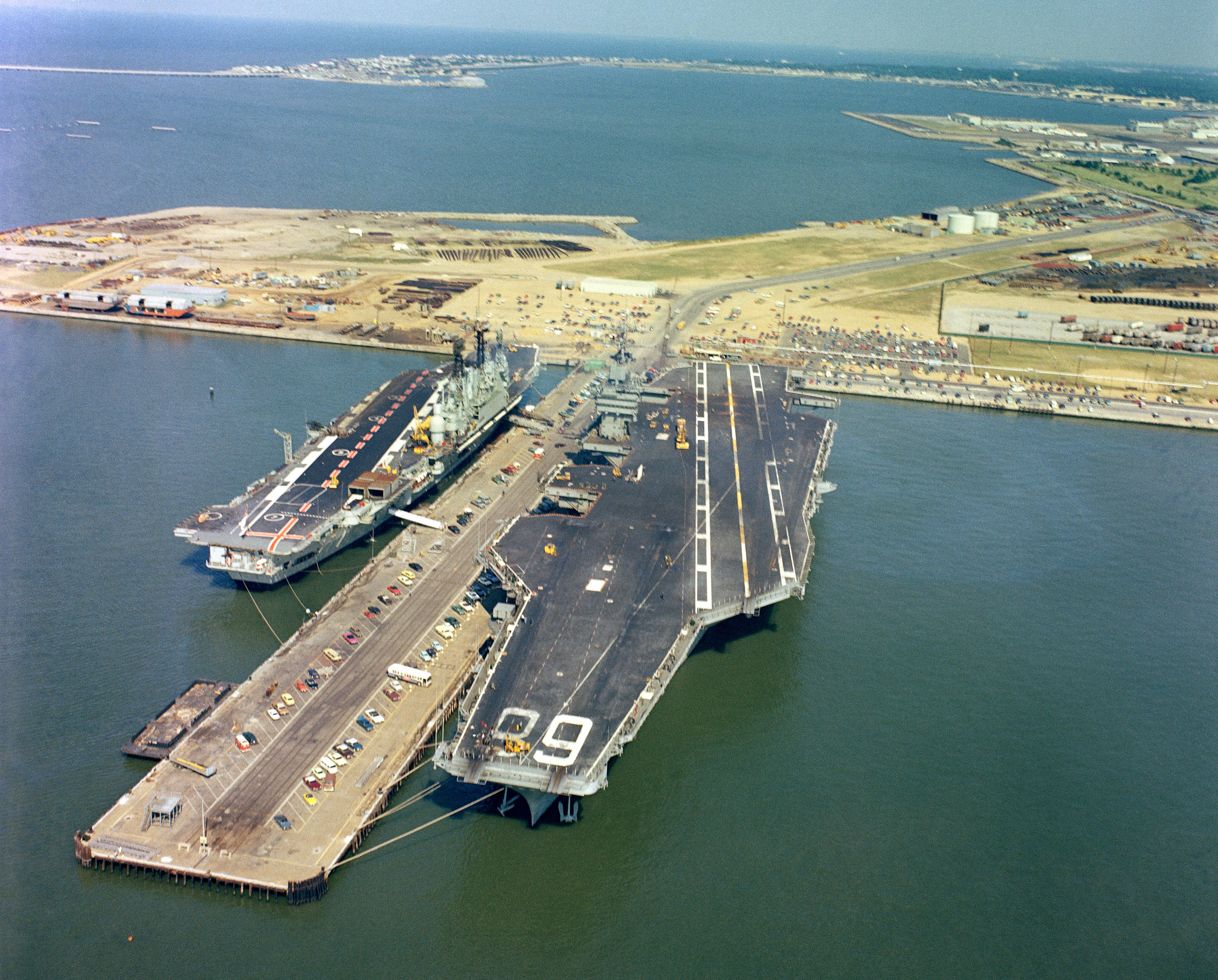
HMS Ark Royal (left) next to USS Nimitz in 1978.

The Audacious class was originally designed as an expansion of the Implacable class with double storied hangars. However, it was realised that the hangar height would not be sufficient for the new aircraft that were expected to enter service, so the design was considerably enlarged.

Four ships were laid down between 1942 and 1943 during World War II as part of the British naval buildup – Africa, Irresistible, Audacious and Eagle. At the end of hostilities Africa and Eagle were cancelled. Work on the remaining two was suspended. They would be renamed and built to differing designs in the 1950s.

As the builds of Audacious (renamed Eagle) and Irresistible (renamed Ark Royal) progressed they differed so much that they effectively became the lead (and sole) ships of each of their own classes. They formed the backbone of the postwar carrier fleet, and were much modified.

== Ships in class ==
Name	Pennant Number	Builder	Laid Down	Launched	Commissioned	Fate
HMS Eagle	R05	Harland & Wolff, Belfast	24 October 1942 as HMS Audacious.; Renamed at the start of 1946 as Eagle after the aircraft carrier that was sunk in 1942.	19 March 1946	5 October 1951	Decommissioned 26 January 1972.
HMS Ark Royal	R09	Cammell Laird, Birkenhead	3 May 1943 as HMS Irresistible; Later renamed after the third Ark Royal that was lost in 1941.	3 May 1950	22 February 1955	Decommissioned 14 February 1979.
HMS Eagle	N/A	Ordered from Swan Hunter, Wallsend-on-Tyne in August 1942.; Transferred to Vickers-Armstrongs in December that year.	19 April 1944	N/A	N/A	Cancelled January 1946 when 23% complete.
HMS Africa	N/A	Ordered from Fairfield, Govan on 12 July 1943.; Later Re-ordered as a Malta-class aircraft carrier in 1944.	N/A	N/A	N/A	Cancelled 15 October 1945.
