= French ship Capricieuse =

Several ships of the French Navy have borne the name Capricieuse ("Capricious"):

== Ships named Capricieuse ==
- Capricieuse (1761), a 3-gun gunboat, deleted from Navy lists in 1766.
- Capricieuse (1779), a 32-gun ship, captured by HMS Prudente and Licorne in 1780 off Cape Ortegal. Due to damaged sustained in the action, she was scuttled.
- Capricieuse (1786), a 32-gun Capricieuse-class frigate. She was wrecked at the entrance of Blavet river in 1799.
- Capricieuse (1793), a 4-gun tartane, captured by HMS Termagant on 22 August 1800
- Capricieuse (1828), an aviso
- Capricieuse (1849), a 22-gun corvette.
Ships of the French Navy named Capricieuse
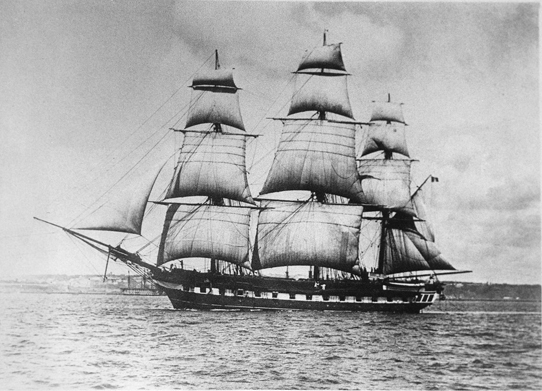
Capricieuse (1849)

== See also ==
- French ship Capricieux
