= French submarine Lagrange =

French Navy Submarine

Lagrange
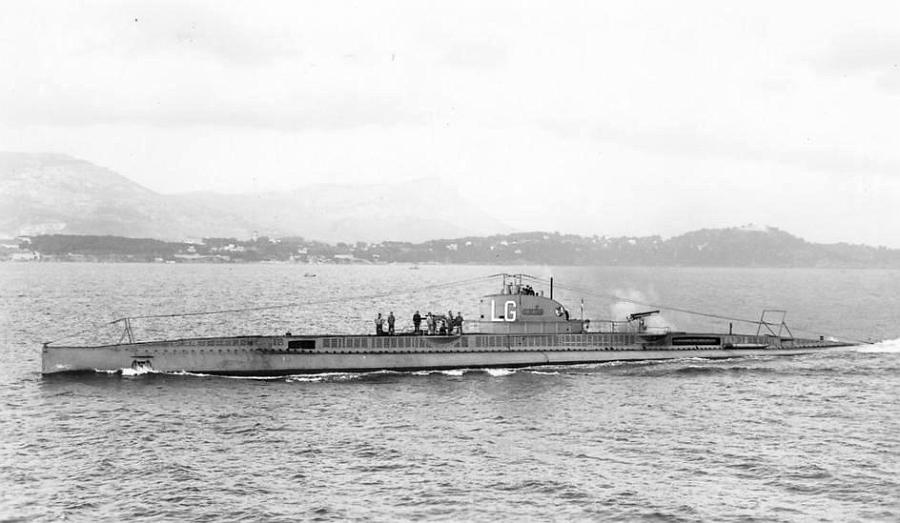
- Lagrange between 1922 and 1923

History

France
- Name: Lagrange
- Namesake: Joseph-Louis Lagrange
- Builder: Arsenal de Toulon
- Laid down: 1913
- Launched: 31 May 1917
- Completed: February 1918
- Commissioned: February 1918
- Out of service: July 1935
- Fate: Stricken and sold for scrap in 1935

General characteristics
- Type: Submarine
- Displacement: 920 tonnes (905 long tons) (surfaced); 1,318 tonnes (1,297 long tons) (submerged)
- Length: 75.2 m (246 ft 9 in)
- Beam: 6.3 m (20 ft 8 in)
- Draught: 3.6 m (11 ft 10 in)
- Propulsion: 2 × diesel engines, 2,600 hp (1,939 kW); 2 × electric motors, 1,640 hp (1,223 kW)
- Speed: 16.5 knots (30.6 km/h) (surfaced); 11 knots (20 km/h) (submerged)
- Range: 4,300 nautical miles (8,000 km) at 10 knots (19 km/h); 125 nautical miles (232 km) at 5 knots (9.3 km/h) (submerged)
- Test depth: 50 m (160 ft)
- Complement: 47
- Armament: 8 × 450 mm (17.7 in) torpedo tubes; 2 × 75 mm (3.0 in) deck guns; 2 × 8 mm (0.31 in) machine guns

The French submarine Lagrange (Q112) was a Lagrange-class submarine built for the French Navy built between 1913 and 1918. It was laid down in the Arsenal de Toulon shipyards and launched on August 12, 1919. Lagrange was completed in 1918 but saw no action during World War I and served in the French Marine Nationale until 1935.

== Design ==
The Lagrange class submarines were constructed as part of the French fleet's expansion programmes from 1913 to 1914. The ships were designed by Julien Hutter, slightly modifying his previous project Dupuy de Lôme, using two Parsons steam turbines with a power of 2,000 hp (1,491 kW). During construction, though, the idea was abandoned and the ships were instead equipped with diesel engines.

75.2 m (246 ft 9 in) long, with a beam of 6.3 m (20 ft 8 in) and a draught of 3.6 m (11 ft 10 in), Lagrange-class submarines could dive up to 50 m (160 ft). The submarine had a surfaced displacement of 920 tonnes (905 long tons) and a submerged displacement of 1,318 tonnes (1,297 long tons). Propulsion while surfaced was provided by two 2,600 hp (1,939 kW) diesel motors built by the Swiss manufacturer Sulzer and two 1,640 hp (1,223 kW) electric motors. The submarines' electrical propulsion allowed it to attain speeds of 11 knots (20 km/h; 13 mph) while submerged and 16.5 knots (30.6 km/h; 19.0 mph) on the surface. Their surfaced range was 7,700 nautical miles (14,300 km) at 9 knots (17 km/h), and 4,000 nautical miles (7,400 km) at 12 knots (22 km/h), with a submerged range of 70 nautical miles (130 km) at 5 knots (9.3 km/h).

The ships were equipped with eight 450 mm torpedo tubes (four in the bow, two stern and two external), with a total of 10 torpedoes and two on-board guns. The class was also armed with a 75 mm with an ammo supply of 440 shells. The crew of one ship consisted of four officers and 43 of officers and seamen.

== Service history ==
Lagrange was built in the Arsenal de Toulon. It was laid down in 1913, launched on 31 May 1917, and completed in 1921. It was named in honor of the distinguished French eighteenth-century mathematician Joseph-Louis Lagrange. From 1922 to 1923, Lagrange underwent a major refit in which it received a new conning tower, bridge and periscope. Lagrange served in the Mediterranean Sea until 1935.
