= Espadon =

Espadon (swordfish in French) may refer to:

- Ecurie Espadon, a formula one team
- French ship Espadon, three French submarines
- Sud-Ouest Espadon, a late 1940s experimental French jet interceptor aircraft
