= French ship Capricieux =

Three French ships of the French Navy have borne the name Capricieux ("Capricious"):

- A fireship (1671)
- Capricieux (1689), a 34-gun ship of the line
- Capricieux (1753), a 64-gun ship of the line

== See also ==
- French ship Capricieuse
