= HMS Malta =

Four ships of Royal Navy have been named HMS Malta after the Mediterranean island:

- HMS Malta (1800 schooner) was a Spanish 10-gun schooner built and launched in the United States of America in 1797. The British captured her in 1800 and renamed her HMS Gozo in December 1800. She was sold in 1804.
- HMS Malta (1800) was an 80-gun third rate, originally the French ship Guillaume Tell, captured from France in 1800. She was assigned to harbour service in 1831 and broken up in 1840.
- HMS Malta (1854) was a paddle steamer originally called Britannia and purchased in 1854. She was sold in 1856.
- HMS Malta (D93) was to have been the lead ship of the Malta-class aircraft carriers. She was laid down in 1944 but construction was cancelled in 1945.

== See also ==
- HMS Melita, three ships of the Royal Navy named for the Latin name of Malta.
