= Malta-class aircraft carrier =

Royal Navy aircraft carrier class

Class overview
- Name: Malta
- Operators: Royal Navy
- Preceded by: Audacious class
- Succeeded by: CVA-01 (cancelled)
- Planned: 4
- Canceled: 4

General characteristics (Design X1)
- Type: Aircraft carrier
- Displacement: 46,890 long tons (47,642 t) (standard); 57,700 long tons (58,626 t) (deep load)
- Length: 897 ft (273.4 m) (o/a); 850 ft (259.1 m) (waterline)
- Beam: 115 ft 6 in (35.2 m)
- Draught: 35 ft (10.7 m) (deep load)
- Installed power: 200,000 shp (150,000 kW); 8 Admiralty 3-drum boilers
- Propulsion: 4 shafts; 4 geared steam turbines
- Speed: 33.25 knots (61.58 km/h; 38.26 mph)
- Range: 7,100 nmi (13,100 km; 8,200 mi) at 20 knots (37 km/h; 23 mph)
- Complement: 3,500
- Armament: 8 × twin QF 4.5-inch dual-purpose guns; 8 × sextuple, 7 × single 40 mm Bofors anti-aircraft guns
- Armour: Waterline belt: 4 in (102 mm); Deck: 4 in (102 mm); Bulkheads: 2–4 in (51–102 mm)
- Aircraft carried: 80–108
- Aviation facilities: 2 catapults

The Malta-class aircraft carrier was a British large aircraft carrier design of World War II. Four ships were ordered in 1943 for the Royal Navy, but changing tactical concepts, based on American experience in the Pacific War, caused repeated changes to the design, which was not completed before the end of the war. All four ships were cancelled in 1945 before they were laid down.

== Background ==
In July 1942 the Royal Navy formed the Future Building Committee, chaired by the Deputy First Sea Lord (Admiral Kennedy-Purvis), to examine the fleet's requirements for the rest of the war. Tasked with anticipating the Navy's readiness and requirements for January 1944, the committee realised that a major expansion of naval aviation was required, which meant that more aircraft carriers would be needed. Many factors combined to drive up the size of these new carriers, notably the increasing size and speed of aircraft and the desire to increase the numbers of aircraft aboard fleet carriers. Another important consideration was the change in carrier tactics from the earlier doctrine of more attacks with smaller numbers of aircraft to the use of large, single airstrikes.

Sir Stanley V. Goodall, Director of Naval Construction (DNC), proposed a variety of designs, both open and closed hangar. On 8 October 1943, the Board of Admiralty selected a closed-hangar design with an armoured flight deck and five propeller shafts. Reports of American operations in the Pacific convinced the Board to reconsider hangar design; American experience had shown that the ability to fly off all of a carrier's aircraft in a single airstrike was vital. That required a well-ventilated, open-hangar design, which would reduce the time required to launch the aircraft by allowing them to begin the typical 15-minute engine warm-up while still in the hangar. On 15 May 1944, the Board reversed itself and ordered the DNC to produce an open-hangar design with deck-edge lifts. An unarmoured flight deck was agreed upon in June by the Controller of the Navy (Admiral Wake-Walker) and the Fifth Sea Lord (Admiral Boyd).

The new design, 900 ft (270 m) long at the waterline and known as Design X, was submitted to the Board on 10 August, although it was not approved. In October, concerns arose over the size of Design X in that it might have problems manoeuvring in constricted harbours, and the DNC was asked for two smaller designs: X1, 50 ft (15 m) shorter, and Y, 150 ft (46 m) shorter. Design Y was too short for efficient operations with the larger aircraft the committee anticipated, and the First Sea Lord (Admiral Cunningham) selected X1. It was submitted to the Board on 12 April 1945 and fully worked out in anticipation of approval that never came. The Board minutes for 31 August noted that further consideration of the design had been postponed.

== Description ==
Had the X1 design received final approval, the Malta class would have been about the same size as the American Midway-class aircraft carriers at 897 feet (273.4 m) in length overall and 850 feet (259.1 m) at the waterline. The beam would have been 115 feet 6 inches (35.2 m) at the waterline and they would have had a draught of 35 feet (10.7 m) at deep load. The ships would have displaced 46,890 long tons (47,642 t) at standard load and 57,700 long tons (58,626 t) at deep load. Their metacentric heights were estimated to be 8.42 feet (2.6 m) at standard load and 12.8 feet (3.9 m) at deep load. A crew of 3,520 (officers and other ranks) would be required.

The 888-foot (271 m) flight deck had a maximum width of 121 feet 9 inches (37.1 m). Because the unarmoured flight deck required an expansion joint about amidships, the Maltas' island could not be a single structure and was split into two, each section with its own funnel. This allowed turbulence around the islands to be reduced and provided more space for radars and fire-control directors. The carriers would have been fitted with 16 arrestor cables that were designed to stop landing aircraft up to 20,000 lb (9.1 t) in weight, at speeds of up to 75 kn (139 km/h; 86 mph). They would have been backed up by three crash barricades to prevent landing aircraft from crashing into aircraft parked on the ship's bow. Positioned on the forward part of the flight deck, two newly designed hydraulic aircraft catapults were intended to launch fully laden aircraft at 130 kn (240 km/h; 150 mph). (Note: The best hydro-pneumatic catapult that the British actually built, the BH5, could only reach a speed of 75 knots.) The ships were designed with four 30,000-pound (14,000 kg) capacity lifts for rapid movement of aircraft between the flight deck and the hangar. There were two 45 by 46 ft (13.7 by 14.0 m) lifts on the centreline, and two 54 by 36 ft (16.5 by 11.0 m) lifts on the portside deck edge. The hangar was 440 ft (134.1 m) long with a maximum width of 90 ft (27.4 m). To accommodate American-built aircraft the hangar was 17 ft 6 in (5.33 m). In case of fire the hangar was intended to be divided by four sliding steel doors. Between the hangar spaces and the deck park, the Malta class would have been capable of accommodating between 80 and 108 aircraft. For these aircraft, the ships would have been provided with 190,000 imp gal (860,000 L) of petrol.

=== Propulsion ===
The ships would have used four Parsons double-reduction geared steam turbines, each driving one shaft, using steam supplied by eight Admiralty 3-drum boilers. The boilers were distributed among four boiler compartments, but all four turbines were in a single compartment, well aft. The turbines were designed to produce a total of 200,000 shp (150,000 kW), enough to give them a maximum speed of 33.25 knots (61.58 km/h; 38.26 mph). The Malta class was designed to carry a maximum of 7,000 long tons (7,112 t) of fuel oil and diesel fuel (for the emergency generators); this was intended to give the ships a range of 7,100 nautical miles (13,100 km; 8,200 mi) at 20 knots (37 km/h; 23 mph) or 5,600 nautical miles (10,400 km; 6,400 mi) at 24 knots (44 km/h; 28 mph).

=== Armament ===
The planned main armament was sixteen QF 4.5-inch (113 mm) Mark VII dual-purpose guns in eight powered RP 41 Mk VII twin-gun turrets, four on each side of the hull. The 4.5-inch gun had a maximum range of 20,760 yd (18,980 m) at an elevation of +45° and a ceiling of 41,000 ft (12,000 m). The light anti-aircraft (AA) armament would have consisted of 55 40 mm Bofors AA guns in eight sextuple stabilised, powered RP 50 Mk VI mounts and seven single mounts of an unknown type. The Bofors gun had a maximum range of 10,750 yd (9,830 m) and a ceiling of 23,500 ft (7,200 m).

=== Electronics ===
An August 1944 study anticipated that the ships would carry four early warning radars, including height-finders, four surface search radars and eight gunnery/fire-control radars. Historian David Hobbs wrote that they would mount Type 960 early warning, Type 982 intercept, Type 983 height-finding and Type 293M target indication radars. In addition a number of gunnery radars would also be needed.

=== Protection ===
The four-inch (102 mm) thick hangar-deck armour of Design X1 was a reduction from the 6 in (150 mm) called for in the original X configuration. The waterline armour belt was also four inches thick, but covered only the central portion of the ship. To form the armoured citadel the belt was closed by three-inch (76 mm) transverse bulkheads fore and aft. One and a half inches (38 mm) of armour extended 40 feet (12.2 m) forward and 60 feet (18.3 m) aft of the belt to protect the waterline against splinter damage.

The underwater defence system was a layered system of liquid- and air-filled compartments, backed by an inclined holding bulkhead that was four inches thick at the top and tapered to a thickness of two inches (51 mm) at the bottom, and was estimated to resist a 1,200-pound (540 kg) explosive charge. An earlier version, however, had been estimated to be able to resist a 2,000-pound (910 kg) charge, but failed against a 1,000-pound (450 kg) charge in a full-scale test.

The magazines for the 4.5-inch guns and the steering gear both lay outside the armoured citadel but had their own armour. The magazines had four-inch roofs and sides, with three-inch ends while the steering gear also had a four-inch roof, but only three-inch sides and ends.

== Ordering and cancellation ==
Well before the design was finalised, four ships were ordered in July 1943. Africa was originally ordered as an unnamed Audacious-class carrier, but the order was modified to a Malta-class ship on 12 July 1943. Malta, New Zealand and Gibraltar were all ordered three days later. New Zealand was originally ordered from Cammell Laird, but the contract was transferred to Harland and Wolff on 22 July 1944. The Admiralty ordered Vickers not to order any more material on 27 April 1944 and given that final drawings were never issued to the builders, it is unlikely that any of them actually did more than preliminary work. None of the ships were ever laid down and all of them were cancelled before the end of 1945.

=== Ships ===
Name	Assigned builder	Yard number	Cancelled
HMS Africa	Fairfield Shipbuilding and Engineering Co., Govan, Scotland	722	15 October 1945
HMS Gibraltar	Vickers-Armstrongs, Newcastle-upon-Tyne	82	15 October 1945
HMS Malta	John Brown & Co., Clydebank	624	13 December 1945
HMS New Zealand	Cammell Laird, Birkenhead then Harland and Wolff, Belfast, Northern Ireland	1159 then 1304	13 December 1945
