= French corvette Capricieuse =

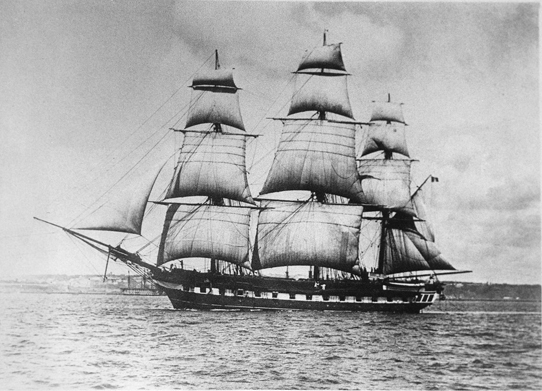
- Photograph of Capricieuse

History

France
- Name: Capricieuse
- Namesake: "Capricious", "whimsical"
- Builder: Toulon
- Laid down: October 1847
- Launched: 5 July 1849
- Stricken: 18 March 1865
- Fate: Broken up 1868

General characteristics
- Length: 43.9 m (144 ft)
- Beam: 11.8 m (39 ft)
- Draught: 4.9 m (16 ft)
- Complement: 244 men
- Armament: 2 × 30-pounder long guns; 2 × 16-pounder Paixhans guns; other guns on main battery

The Capricieuse was a late 22-gun corvette of the French Navy.

== Career ==
Capricieuse was commissioned under Arnault de Gorse on 1 September 1849. From 1850, she served in the Far East under Captain Rocquemaurel, returning to Toulon in 1854. She then took part in the Crimean War as a troopship.

In 1855, it sailed in the Gulf of St. Lawrence with commander Paul-Henry de Belvèze.

Capricieuse returned to China in 1856. In 1858, she took part in the Battle of Canton, being present at the capture of the city on 30 January and at the Battle of Taku Forts.

She returned to Toulon in 1860. Struck in 1865, she was broken up in 1868.
