= French ship Monge (A601) =

Missile range instrumentation ship

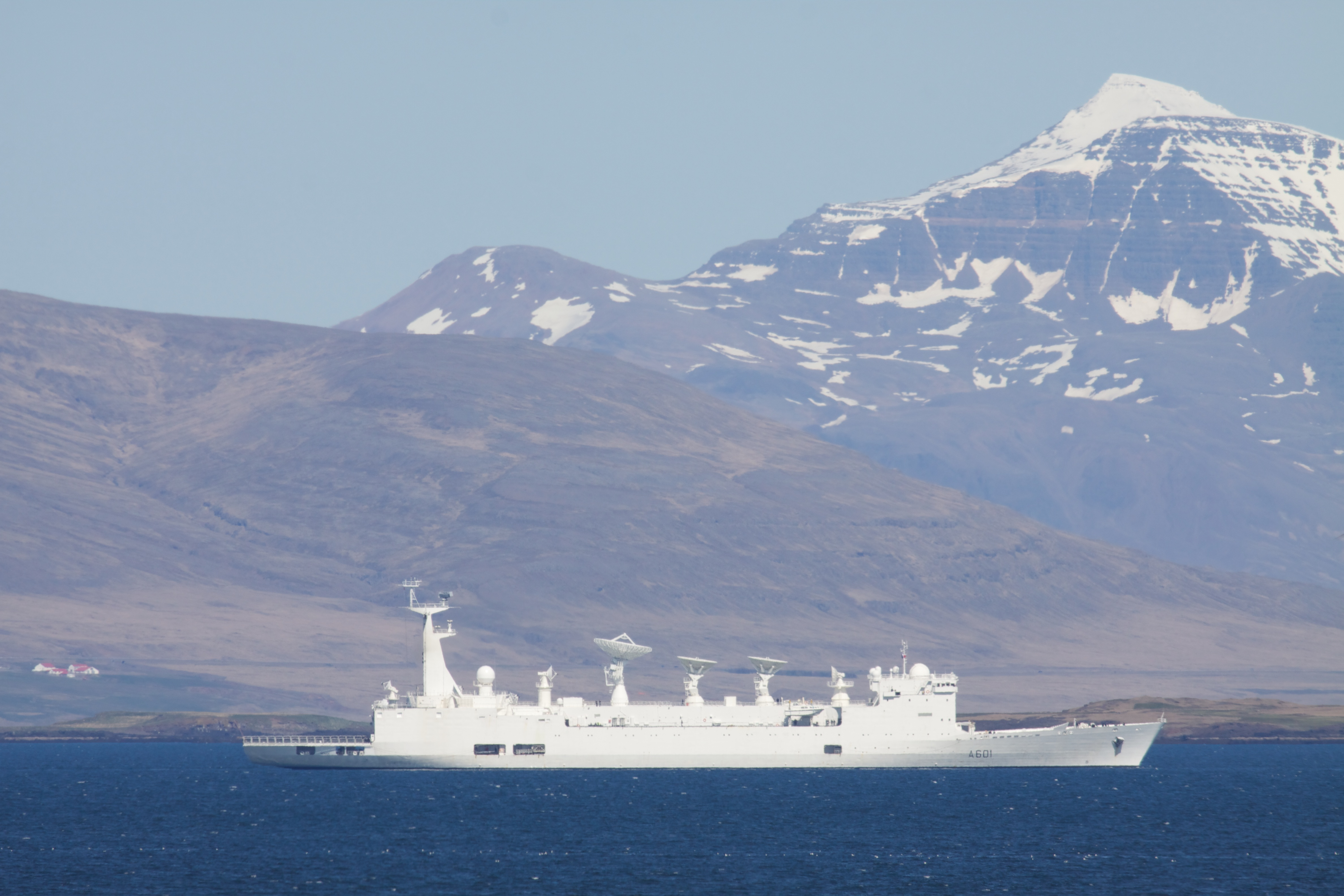
- Monge arriving in Reykjavík Harbour in May 2012

History

France
- Name: Monge
- Namesake: Gaspard Monge
- Ordered: 25 November 1988
- Builder: Chantiers de l'Atlantique, Saint-Nazaire
- Laid down: 26 March 1990
- Launched: 6 October 1990
- Commissioned: 5 November 1992
- Identification: Hull number A 601
- Status: Ship in active service

General characteristics
- Type: Tracking ship
- Displacement: 17,760 long tons (18,040 t) standard; 21,040 long tons (21,380 t) full load
- Length: 225.6 m (740 ft 2 in)
- Beam: 24.8 m (81 ft 4 in)
- Draught: 7.7 m (25 ft 3 in)
- Propulsion: 2 × SEMT Pielstick 8PC 2.5 L400 diesel engines; 7,800 kW (10,400 hp); 1 × shaft; 1 × 1,360 kW (1,820 hp) bow thruster
- Speed: 16 knots (30 km/h; 18 mph)
- Range: 15,000 nmi (28,000 km; 17,000 mi) at 15 kn (28 km/h; 17 mph)
- Complement: 115 + 90 military and civilian technicians
- Sensors & processing systems: 1 × Thomson-CSF DRBV air search radar; 1 × Gascogne missile tracking radar; 2 × Armor missile tracking radar; 1 × Savoie missile tracking radar; 1 × Stratus trajectory tracking radar; 6 × Antares telemetry radar
- Armament: 2 × 20 mm modèle F2 gun; 2 × 12.7 mm (0.50 in) machine guns
- Aircraft carried: 1 × Aérospatiale Alouette III helicopter
- Aviation facilities: 650 m^{2} (7,000 sq ft) platform; 180 m^{2} (1,900 sq ft) hangar, can operate heavy helicopters.

Monge (A601), named after the 18th century mathematician Gaspard Monge, is a unique missile range instrumentation ship of the French Navy dedicated to tracking and measuring rocket trajectories. She was built for the trials of the submarine-launched ballistic missiles of the French Navy, and is also used to monitor the launch of Ariane rockets. The ship was built by Chantiers de l'Atlantique, Saint-Nazaire and was launched on 6 October 1990. The vessel entered service on 5 November 1992 and is based at Brest, France.

== Description ==
Monge is a unique missile range instrumentation ship of the French Navy. The vessel has a standard displacement of 17,760 long tons (18,040 t) and 21,040 long tons (21,380 t) at full load. The ship measures 225.6 metres (740 ft 2 in) long overall with a beam of 24.8 metres (81 ft 4 in) and a draught of 7.7 metres (25 ft 3 in). Monge is powered by two SEMT Pielstick 8PC 2.5 L400 diesel engines driving one shaft turning a controllable-pitch propeller, rated at 7,800 kW (10,400 hp). The vessel is also equipped with one 1,360 kW (1,820 hp) bow thruster. The ship has a maximum speed of 16 knots (30 km/h; 18 mph) and a range of 15,000 nautical miles (28,000 km; 17,000 mi) at 15 knots (28 km/h; 17 mph).

The missile range instrumentation ship mounts two 20 mm modèle F2 guns and two 12.7 mm (0.50 in) machine guns. Monge has a 650 m^{2} (7,000 sq ft) landing platform and a 180 m^{2} (1,900 sq ft) hangar. The ship can operate heavy helicopters. Monge is equipped with one Aérospatiale Alouette III helicopter. The vessel has a complement of 115 naval personnel plus 90 military and civilian technicians.

=== Radar systems ===
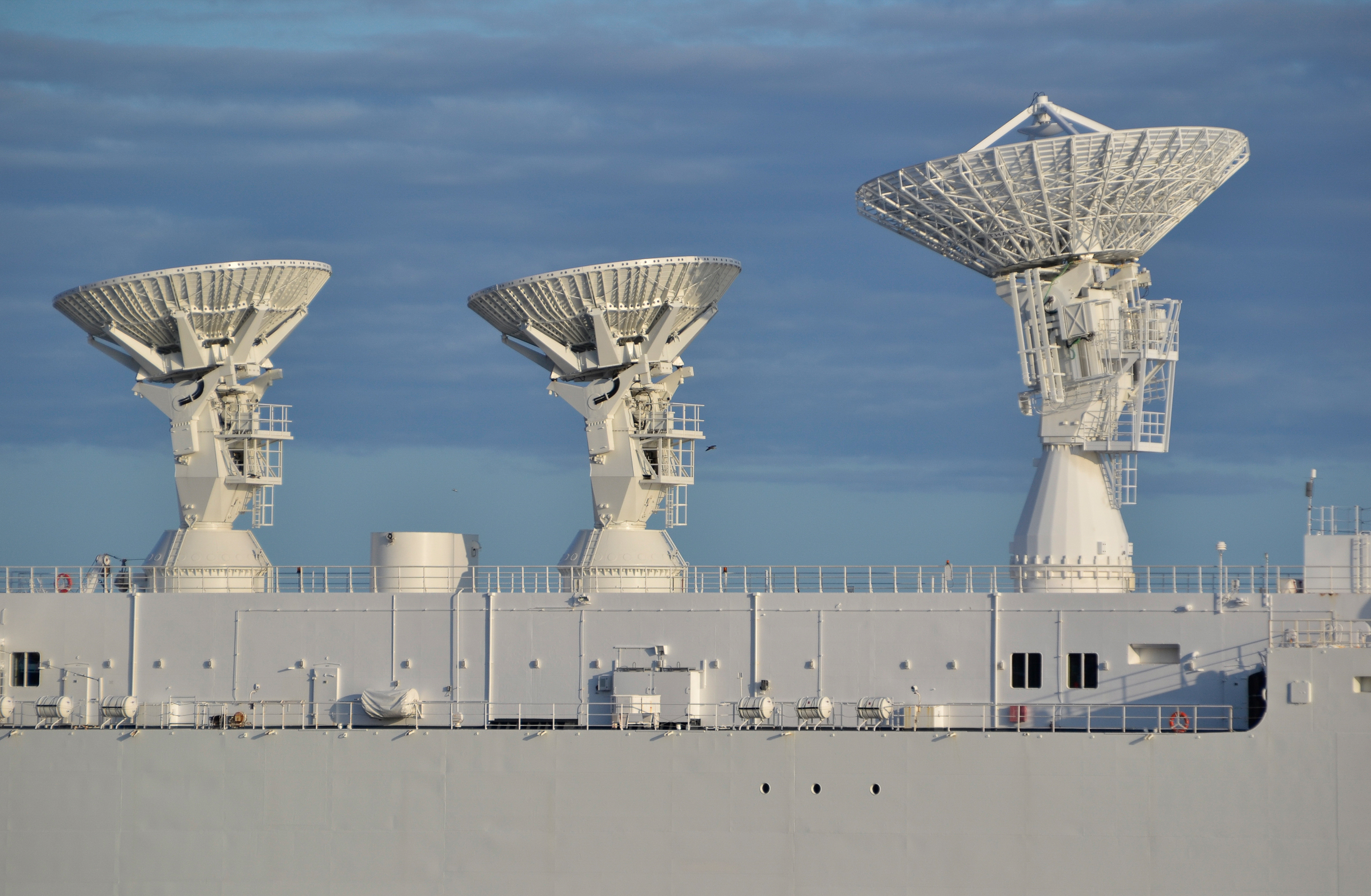
Radar antennas of the vessel

The systems in Monge allow the vessel to track missiles and satellites. There are two navigational radars operating on the I-band, one for control of the helicopters, and a Thomson-CSF DRBV 15C air surveillance radar operating on the E and F-bands installed. The intelligence systems are a Stratus radar operating on the L-band for trajectory tracking, a Gascogne, two Armor, and one Savoie radars for missile tracking operating on the C-band. Furthermore, there are six Antares telemetry-tracking radars operating on the E and F-bands, a laser-radar, and an optical tracking unit, and 14 antennas for telemetry. In 2009, the Stratus and Savoie radars were replaced by a Normandie radar for the trials of the M51 missile.

== Service history ==
The ship was ordered on 25 November 1988 as a replacement for the aging Henri Poincaré. The ship's keel was laid down on 26 March 1990 with the yard number H39 by Chantiers de l'Atlantique at their yard in Saint-Nazaire, France. Monge, named for the 18th century mathematician Gaspard Monge, was launched on 6 October 1990. Monge entered service with the French Navy on 5 November 1992, given the hull number A 601, and is based at Brest, France.

In September 1999, Monge took part in tests in the Bay of Biscay. From 27 March to 1 April 2000, Monge visited Lisbon, Portugal. After the end of a refit in December 2000, Monge validated the launch of the French military satellite Hélios II in December 1999. On 17–18 April 2001, Monge took part in the test firing of an M45 missile off the coast of Brittany. In September 2002, the ship visited Toulon for the first time before travelling to Piraeus, Greece for the Armament Fair. This was the ship's first deployment to the Mediterranean Sea. The deployment ended in October, when Monge returned to the Atlantic, passing Gibraltar on 10 October.

On 15 June 2004, as Monge was manoeuvring in Brest's harbour, the propellers churned up the body of a man. The man was later identified and no foul play was suspected. On 1 February 2005, the ship monitored a test firing of an M45 missile off the coast of Brittany. From 31 May to 24 June, the vessel travelled north, visiting Spitzbergen, Norway before crossing the Arctic Circle and visiting Greenland. Before returning to Brest, the ship visited Edinburgh, Scotland. On 9 November 2006, Monge monitored the first launch of an M51 ballistic missile over the Atlantic Ocean from the Landes Test Centre.

Beginning in 2007, Monge began trials and testing of the Ariane rockets. On 27 November 2010, the French submarine Le Terrible test-fired an M51 ballistic missile from Audierne Bay. Monge monitored the launch. In September 2011, the ship monitored the re-entry of the US Upper Atmosphere Research Satellite. On 24 September, the satellite crashed into the Pacific Ocean. On 1 October 2015, Monge monitored the launch of a new version of the M51 missile.

On 27 September 2018, Monge lost power while returning to Brest. The vessel was within 10 miles (16 km) of the Pierres Noires lighthouse when the ship conducted tests and lost power. The tugboat Abeille Bourbon was dispatched to the tow the vessel the rest of the way into Brest.

In April 2021 it was reported that Monge had docked at the US Navy base in Norfolk, Virginia, possibly on a mission to monitor a test of the French M51 SLBM, launched from Biscarosse in southwestern France. From 4 to 7 June 2022 the ship paid a visit to Lisbon, Portugal, and then made its way to Madeira, Portugal as the French representation during a ceremony to commemorate those who died in a bombing in 1916.

In October 2026, she docked in Halifax, Nova Scotia at the Royal Canadian naval base for 6 days on a multi-month mission.
