= Lagrange-class submarine =

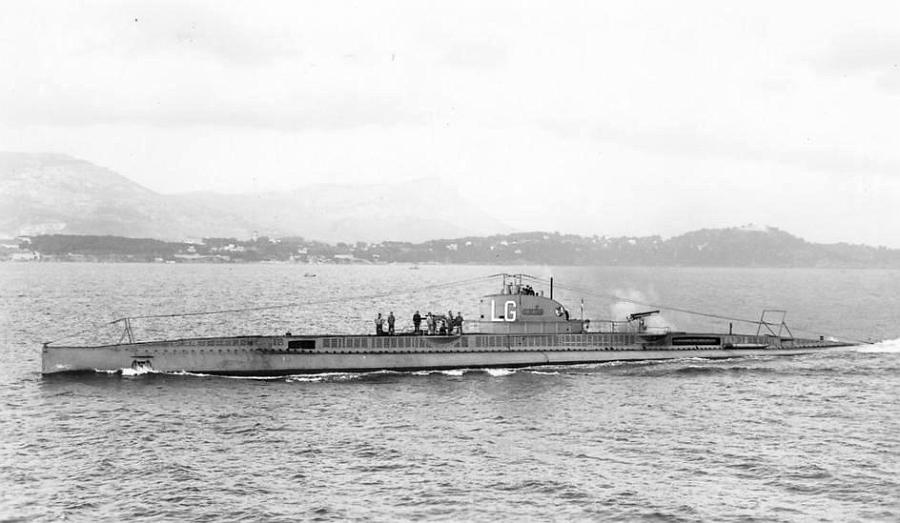
- Lagrange between 1922 and 1923

Class overview
- Name: Lagrange class
- Operators: French Navy
- Preceded by: Armide class
- Succeeded by: O'Byrne class
- Built: 1913–1924
- Planned: 4
- Completed: 4
- Retired: 4

General characteristics
- Type: Submarine
- Displacement: 920 long tons (935 t) (surfaced); 1,318 long tons (1,339 t) (submerged)
- Length: 75.2 m (246 ft 9 in)
- Beam: 6.3 m (20 ft 8 in)
- Draught: 3.6 m (11 ft 10 in)
- Propulsion: 2 × diesel engines, 2,600 hp (1,939 kW); 2 × electric motors, 1,640 hp (1,223 kW)
- Speed: 16.5 knots (30.6 km/h) (surfaced); 11 knots (20 km/h) (submerged)
- Range: 4,300 nautical miles (8,000 km) at 10 knots (19 km/h); 125 nautical miles (232 km) at 5 knots (9.3 km/h) (submerged)
- Test depth: 50 m (160 ft)
- Complement: 47
- Armament: 8 × 450 mm (17.7 in) torpedo tubes; 2 × 75 mm (3.0 in) deck guns; 2 × 8 mm (0.31 in) machine guns

The Lagrange-class submarines were a class of four submarines built for the French Navy during World War I and the interwar period. Three ships of this type were built in the Arsenal de Toulon from 1913 to 1924, and one was built at the Arsenal de Rochefort shipyard. Entering the French Marine Nationale from 1918 to 1924, the submarines served until the mid-1930s.

== Design ==
The Lagrange-class submarines were constructed as part of the French fleet's expansion programmes from 1913 to 1914. The ships were designed by Julien Hutter, who slightly modified his previous project, the Dupuy de Lôme-class submarines, using two Parsons steam turbines with a power of 2,000 hp (1,491 kW). During construction, though, the idea was abandoned and the ships were instead equipped with diesel engines.

75.2 m (246 ft 9 in) long, with a beam of 6.3 m (20 ft 8 in) and a draught of 3.6 m (11 ft 10 in), Lagrange-class submarines could dive up to 50 m (164 ft). The submarines had a surfaced displacement of 920 long tons (935 t) and a submerged displacement of 1,318 long tons (1,339 t). Propulsion while surfaced was provided by two 2,600 hp (1,939 kW) diesel motors built by Swiss manufacturer, Sulzer, and two 1,640 hp (1,223 kW) electric motors. The submarines' electrical propulsion allowed them to attain speeds of 11 knots (20 km/h; 13 mph) while submerged and 16.5 knots (30.6 km/h; 19.0 mph) on the surface. They had surfaced range of 4,300 nautical miles (8,000 km) at 10 knots (19 km/h) and a submerged range of 125 nautical miles (232 km) at 5 knots (9.3 km/h).

The ships were equipped with eight 450 millimetres (18 in) torpedo tubes (four in the bow; two stern and two external), with a total of ten torpedoes and two 75 millimetres (3.0 in) guns. The crew of a ship comprised forty-seven men.

== Ships ==
Of the four Lagrange-class submarines, three were built in the Arsenal de Toulon and one in the Arsenal de Rochefort. The ships were laid down between 1913 and 1914 and launched between 1917 and 1924. The ships were named after French scholars: Joseph-Louis Lagrange, Pierre-Simon Laplace, Henri Victor Regnault and the constructor of submarines Gaston Romazzotti.

Lagrange-class submarines
Name	Laid down	Launched	Completed	Fate
Laplace	1913	8 December 1919	1921	Stricken in 1937
Lagrange	1913	31 May 1917	February 1918	Stricken in 1935
Regnault	1913	25 June 1924	1924	Stricken in 1937
Romazotti	1914	31 March 1918	September 1918	Stricken in 1937

== Service ==
Of the four submarines, only two were commissioned before the end of World War I: Lagrange and Romazzotti, which operated in the Mediterranean Sea.

From 1922 to 1923, the ships underwent a major refit in which they received new major conning towers, bridges and periscopes. All ships served in the Mediterranean Sea until 1935 for Lagrange and 1937 for the other three ships.
