= French submarine Antigone =

Antigone
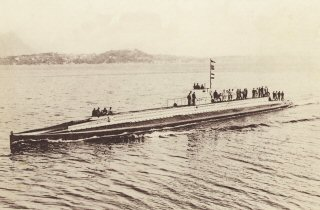
- sister ship Armide, date unknown

History

Greece
- Name: PS
- Builder: Schneider-Creusot shipyards, France
- Laid down: 1912
- Launched: October 1916
- Completed: January 1917 (but not delivered)
- Fate: Requisitioned by the French Navy, 30 May 1917

France
- Name: Antigone
- Acquired: 30 May 1917
- Fate: Stricken and sold for scrap in August 1935.

General characteristics
- Type: Submarine
- Displacement: 457 tonnes (450 long tons) (surfaced); 670 tonnes (659 long tons) (submerged)
- Length: 56.2 m (184 ft 5 in)
- Beam: 5.2 m (17 ft 1 in)
- Draught: 3 m (9 ft 10 in)
- Propulsion: 2 × diesel engines, 2,200 hp (1,641 kW); 2 × electric motors, 900 hp (671 kW)
- Speed: 17.5 knots (32.4 km/h) (surfaced); 11 knots (20 km/h) (submerged)
- Range: 2,600 nautical miles (4,800 km) at 11 knots (20 km/h); 160 nautical miles (300 km) at 5 knots (9.3 km/h) (submerged)
- Complement: 31
- Armament: 4 × 450 mm (17.7 in) torpedo tubes; 1 × 47 mm (1.9 in) Hotchkiss deck gun

The French submarine Antigone was an Armide-class diesel-electric attack submarine originally ordered by Greece. It was built in the Schneider-Creusot shipyards between 1912 and 1917, but was requisitioned on 30 May 1917 by the French Government before it was delivered. Antigone operated in the Mediterranean during the course of World War I and was stricken from the Navy list in August 1935.

== Design ==
At 56.2 metres (184 ft) long, with a beam of 5.2 m (17 ft 1 in) and a draught of 3 m (9 ft 10 in), the submarines had a surfaced displacement of 457 tonnes (450 long tons) and a submerged displacement of 670 tonnes (659 long tons). Propulsion while surfaced was provided by two 2,200 hp (1,641 kW) diesel motors built by the Swiss manufacturer Schneider-Carels and two 900 hp (671 kW) electric motors. The submarines' electrical propulsion allowed it to attain speeds of 11 knots (20 km/h; 13 mph) while submerged and 17.5 knots (32.4 km/h; 20.1 mph) on the surface. Their surfaced range was 2,600 nautical miles (4,800 km) at 11 knots (20 km/h), with a submerged range of 160 nautical miles (300 km) at 5 knots (9.3 km/h).

Antigone was armed with four 450 mm (17.7 in) torpedo tubes and a 47 mm (1.9 in) L/50 M1902 Hotchkiss deck gun. The crew of one ship consisted of 31 officers and seamen.

== Construction and service ==
Antigone was ordered by the Greek Navy in 1912, with a design Maxime Laubeuf. The ship, which received the name PS, was requisitioned by the French Government on 30 May 1917 during World War I.

Antigone was built in the Schneider shipyard in Chalon-sur-Saône. It was laid down in 1912, launched in October 1916, and completed in January 1917. It was named after a character in Greek mythology, Antigone. Antigone received the designation SD3.

After its launching, Antigone served on the Adriatic Sea until 1918, when it was assigned to the 3rd submarine Flotilla, based in Moudros. Antigone was struck from the Naval register in August 1935.
