= Aquitaine (disambiguation) =

Aquitaine was a region of France, now part of the Nouvelle-Aquitaine region.

Aquitaine may also refer to:

- Aquitaine Basin
- French ship Aquitaine, two ships of the French Navy
- TER Aquitaine, the regional rail network serving the Aquitaine région
- Aquitaine (train), an express train that ran between Bordeaux and Paris
- The Duchy of Aquitaine, a historic fiefdom in France
- Aquitaine (the city), Attis Aquitaine, or Invidia Aquitaine in Jim Butcher's Codex Alera book series

== See also ==
- Aquitania
