= Victor Regnault =

French physicist (1810–1878)

Victor Regnault ForMemRS
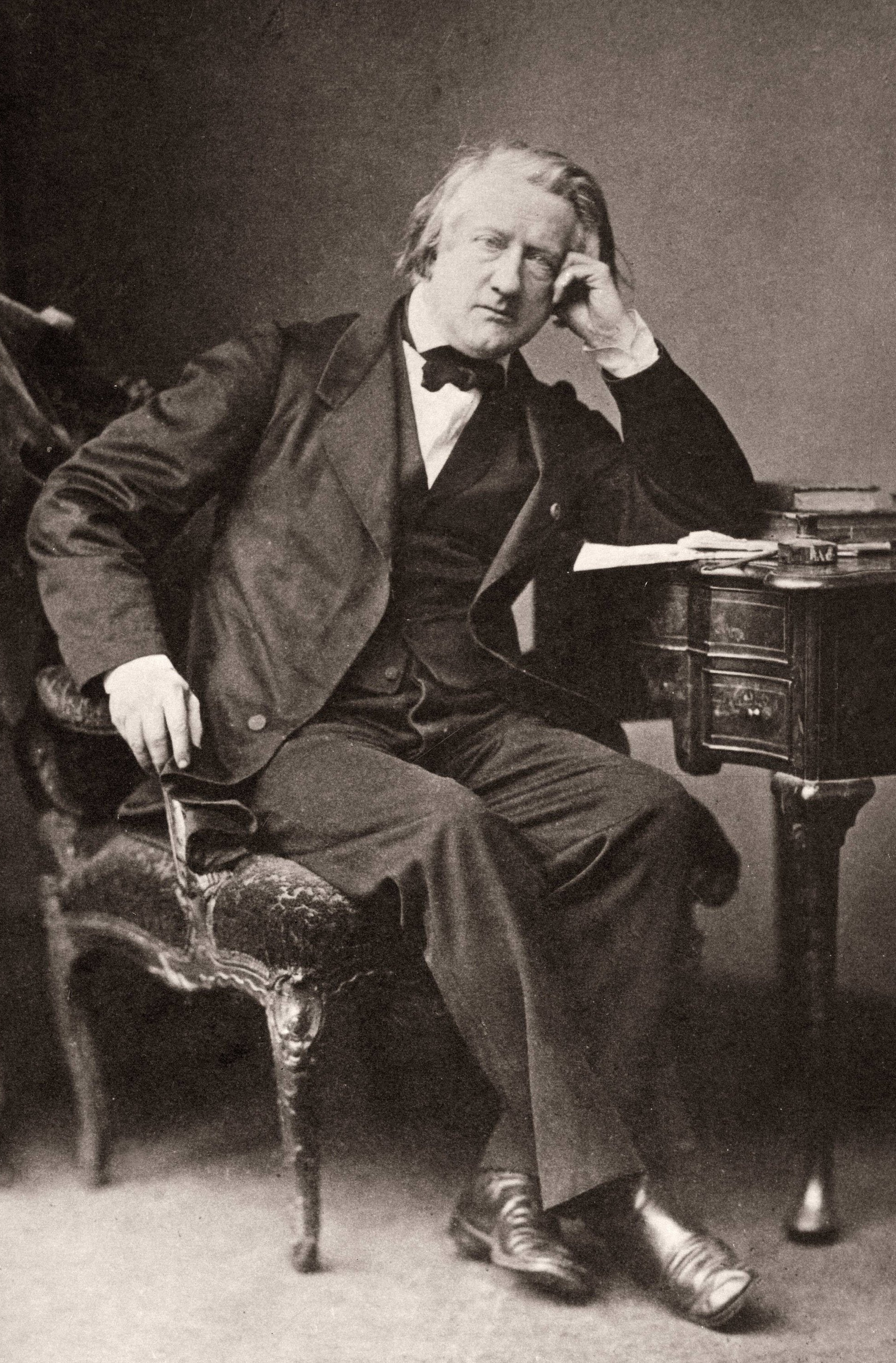
- Regnault in the 1860s
- Born: Henri Victor Regnault; 21 July 1810; Aix-la-Chapelle, France
- Died: 19 January 1878 (aged 67); Paris, France
- Education: École Polytechnique
- Children: Henri Regnault
- Awards: Rumford Medal (1848); Copley Medal (1869); Matteucci Medal (1875)
- Scientific career
- Fields: Thermodynamics
- Thesis: Recherches relatives à l'action de la vapeur d'eau à une haute température sur les métaux et sur les sulfures métalliques (1836)

Henri Victor Regnault ForMemRS (French pronunciation: [ɑ̃ʁi viktɔʁ ʁəɲo]; 21 July 1810 – 19 January 1878) was a French chemist and physicist best known for his careful measurements of the thermal properties of gases. He was an early thermodynamicist and was mentor to William Thomson in the late 1840s. He never used his first given name, and was known throughout his lifetime as Victor Regnault.

== Biography ==
Born in Aix-la-Chapelle in 1810 (modern Aachen, Germany and at that time under French rule), he moved to Paris at the age of eight, following the death of his parents. There, he worked for an upholstery firm until he was eighteen. In 1830, he was admitted to the École Polytechnique, and in 1832 he graduated from the École des mines.

Working under Justus von Liebig at Gießen, Regnault distinguished himself in the nascent field of organic chemistry by synthesizing several chlorinated hydrocarbons (e.g. vinyl chloride in 1835, dichloromethane and carbon tetrachloride in 1839, 1,1,1-Trichloroethane in 1838 or 1840), and he was appointed professor of chemistry at the University of Lyon. In 1840, he was appointed the chair of chemistry of the École Polytechnique, and in 1841, he became a professor of physics in the Collège de France.

Beginning in 1843, he began compiling extensive numerical tables on the properties of steam. These were published in 1847, and inspired Charles Algernon Parsons to develop the steam turbine. Regnault received the Rumford Medal of the Royal Society of London and appointment as Chief Engineer of Mines. In 1851 he was elected a foreign member of the Royal Swedish Academy of Sciences. In 1854 he was appointed director of the porcelain works at Sèvres, the Manufacture nationale de Sèvres. In 1855, he was elected to the American Philosophical Society.

At Sèvres, he continued work on the thermal properties of matter. He designed sensitive thermometers, hygrometers, hypsometers and calorimeters, and measured the specific heats of many substances and the coefficient of thermal expansion of gases. In the course of this work, he discovered that not all gases expand equally when heated and that Boyle's law is only an approximation, especially at temperatures near a substance's boiling point.

Regnault was also an avid amateur photographer. He introduced the use of pyrogallic acid as a developing agent, and was one of the first photographers to use paper negatives. In 1854, he became the founding president of the Société française de photographie.

In 1871, his laboratory at Sèvres was destroyed and his son Alex-Georges-Henri Regnault killed, both as a result of the Franco-Prussian War. He retired from science the next year, never recovering from these losses.

== Legacy ==
The crater Regnault on the Moon is named after Regnault, and his name is one of the 72 names inscribed on the Eiffel Tower. Some have suggested that the symbol R for the ideal gas constant is also named after him.

He was the first president of Société française de photographie.

The French Lagrange-class submarine Regnault, built between 1913 and 1924 was named for him.

== Works ==
- Regnault-Strecker's kurzes Lehrbuch der Chemie. Vieweg, Braunschweig 1851 Digital edition by the University and State Library Düsseldorf
  - 2. Organische Chemie. 1853
  - 1. Anorganische Chemie. 3., verb. Aufl. 1855
  - 2. Organische Chemie. 2. Aufl.1857
  - 1. Anorganische Chemie. 4. Aufl.1858
  - 1. Anorganische Chemie. 9., neu bearb. Aufl. / von Johannes Wislicenus. 1877
