= French submarine Regnault =

Regnault
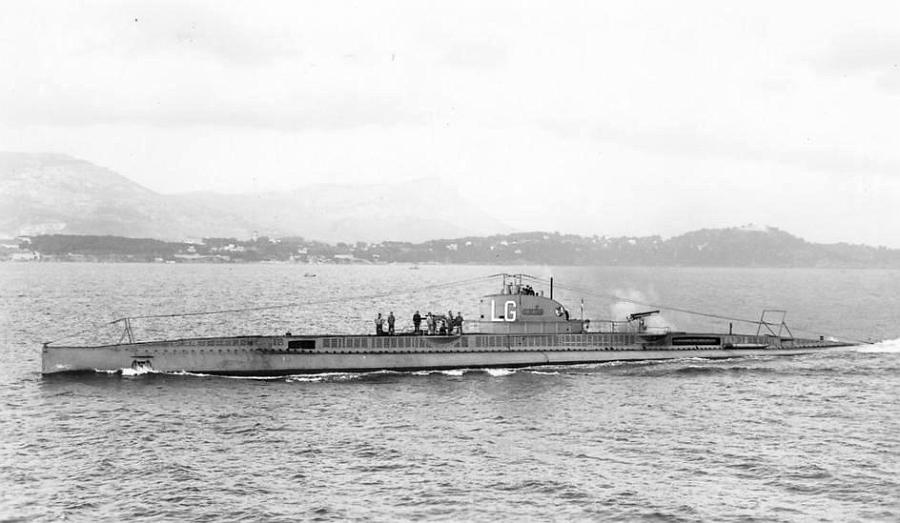
- Sister ship Lagrange between 1922 and 1923

History

France
- Name: Regnault
- Namesake: Henri Victor Regnault
- Builder: Arsenal de Toulon
- Laid down: 1913
- Launched: 25 June 1924
- Completed: 1924
- Commissioned: 1924
- Out of service: 1937
- Fate: Stricken and sold for scrap in 1937

General characteristics
- Class & type: Lagrange-class submarine
- Displacement: 920 tonnes (905 long tons) (surfaced); 1,318 tonnes (1,297 long tons) (submerged)
- Length: 75.2 m (246 ft 9 in)
- Beam: 6.3 m (20 ft 8 in)
- Draught: 3.6 m (11 ft 10 in)
- Propulsion: 2 × diesel engines, 2,600 hp (1,939 kW); 2 × electric motors, 1,640 hp (1,223 kW)
- Speed: 16.5 knots (30.6 km/h) (surfaced); 11 knots (20 km/h) (submerged)
- Range: 4,300 nautical miles (8,000 km) at 10 knots (19 km/h); 125 nautical miles (232 km) at 5 knots (9.3 km/h) (submerged)
- Test depth: 50 m (160 ft)
- Complement: 47
- Armament: 8 × 450 mm (17.7 in) torpedo tubes; 2 × 75 mm (3.0 in) deck guns; 2 × 8 mm (0.31 in) machine guns

The French submarine Regnault (Q113) was a Lagrange-class submarine built for the French Navy built between 1913 and 1924. It was laid down in the Arsenal de Toulon shipyards and launched on 25 June 1924. Regnault was completed in 1924 and served in the French Marine Nationale until 1937.

== Design ==
The Lagrange-class submarines were constructed as part of the French fleet's expansion programmes from 1913 to 1914. The ships were designed by Julien Hutter, slightly modifying his previous project Dupuy de Lôme, using two Parsons steam turbines with a power of 2,000 hp (1,491 kW). During construction, though, the idea was abandoned and the ships were instead equipped with diesel engines.

Lagrange-class submarines were 75.2 m (246 ft 9 in) long, with a beam of 6.3 m (20 ft 8 in) and a draught of 3.6 m (11 ft 10 in), and could dive up to 50 m (160 ft). The submarine had a surfaced displacement of 920 tonnes (905 long tons) and a submerged displacement of 1,318 tonnes (1,297 long tons). Propulsion while surfaced was provided by two 2,600 hp (1,939 kW) diesel motors built by the Swiss manufacturer Sulzer and two 1,640 hp (1,223 kW) electric motors. The submarines' electrical propulsion allowed it to attain speeds of 11 knots (20 km/h; 13 mph) while submerged and 16.5 knots (30.6 km/h; 19.0 mph) on the surface. Their surfaced range was 7,700 nautical miles (14,300 km) at 9 knots (17 km/h), and 4,000 nautical miles (7,400 km) at 12 knots (22 km/h), with a submerged range of 70 nautical miles (130 km) at 5 knots (9.3 km/h).

The ships were equipped with eight 450 mm torpedo tubes (four in the bow, two stern and two external), with a total of 10 torpedoes and two on-board guns. The class was also armed with a 75 mm gun with an ammo supply of 440 shells. The crew of one ship consisted of four officers and 43 of officers and seamen.

== Service history ==
Regnault was built in the Arsenal de Toulon. It was laid down in 1913, launched on 25 June 1924, and completed in 1924. It was named in honor of the distinguished French nineteenth-century chemist Henri Victor Regnault and was assigned the pennant number Q113. Regnault served in the Mediterranean Sea until 1935.
