= Meduza =

Meduza may refer to:

- Meduza (Russian folklore), a mythical creature
- Meduza (producers), a team of Italian record producers
- Meduza (website), a Russian- and English-language online newspaper based in Latvia
- Meduza Island, Antarctica
- Eddie Meduza (Errol Leonard Norstedt, 1948–2002), Swedish composer and musician

== See also ==
- Medusa (disambiguation)
