= HMS Melita =

Three ships of the Royal Navy have been named HMS Melita, named after the island of Malta:

- HMS Melita (1888), launched in 1888 was a Mariner-class composite screw sloop, the only Royal Navy warship ever built in Malta. She swapped names with HMS Ringdove in 1915 and was sold as a salvage vessel to Falmouth Docks Board in 1920, when her name was changed to Ringdove's Aid. She was sold again in 1927 to the Liverpool & Glasgow Salvage Association, who changed her name to Restorer, and she was finally broken up in 1937.
- HMS Melita was launched in 1889 as the Redbreast-class composite screw gunboat HMS Ringdove. She became a salvage vessel in 1915 and was renamed HMS Melita (when the first Melita was renamed Ringdove). She was sold in 1920.
- HMS Melita (J289), launched in 1942, was an Algerine-class minesweeper, scrapped on 25 February 1959.

== See also ==
- HMS Malta, four ships of the Royal Navy named for the island of Malta.
