= HMS Renown =

Eight ships of the Royal Navy have borne the name Renown, whilst three others have borne the name at various stages in their construction:

- English ship Renown (1651) was a 20-gun fireship, previously the French ship Renommée. She was captured in 1651 by Nonsuch and sold in 1654.
- HMS Renown (1747) was a 30-gun fifth rate, previously the French ship Renommée. She was captured in 1747 by HMS Dover and broken up in 1771.
- HMS Renown (1774) was a 50-gun fourth rate launched in 1774 and broken up in 1794.
- HMS Renown (1798) was a 74-gun third rate launched in 1798. She had been built under the name HMS Royal Oak, but was renamed in 1796. She was on harbour service from 1814 and was broken up in 1835.
- HMS Renown (1857) was a 91-gun second rate launched in 1857 and sold to Prussia in 1870.
- HMS Renown was to have been a Victoria-class battleship, but she was renamed HMS Victoria in 1887 and launched later that year.
- HMS Renown was to have been a Royal Sovereign-class battleship but she was renamed HMS Empress of India in 1890 and launched in 1891.
- HMS Renown (1895) was a unique battleship launched in 1895 and sold for scrap in 1914.
- HMS Renown was to have been a Revenge-class battleship but she was renamed HMS Revenge in 1913 and launched in 1915.
- HMS Renown (1916) was a Renown-class battlecruiser launched in 1916 and sold in 1948.
- HMS Renown (S26) was a Resolution-class submarine launched in 1967. She was paid off in 1996 and is currently awaiting disposal.

== Battle honours ==
Ships named Renown have earned the following battle honours:

- Gabbard, 1653
- Scheveningen, 1653
- Ushant, 1782
- Egypt, 1801
- Norway, 1940
- Spartivento, 1940
- Atlantic, 1940
- Bismarck, 1941
- Mediterranean, 1941
- Malta Convoys, 1941−42
- Arctic, 1942
- North Africa, 1942
- Sabang, 1944
- East Indies, 1944

== See also ==
- French ship Renommée
