= HMS Africa =

Seven ships of the Royal Navy have been named HMS Africa, after the continent of Africa. Two others were planned:

- HMS Africa (1694) was a 46-gun ship in service from 1694 to 1696.
- HMS Africa (1761) was a 64-gun third-rate launched in 1761 and sold in 1774.
- HMS Africa (1781) was a 64-gun third-rate launched in 1781. She fought at the Battle of Trafalgar and was broken up in 1814.
- HMS Africa was a prison ship, launched in 1803 as the 36-gun fifth rate HMS Euryalus (1803). She became a prison ship in 1826, was renamed HMS Africa in 1859 and was sold in 1860.
- HMS Africa (1862) was a wooden-hulled screw sloop launched in 1862 and sold to China later that year. She was renamed China and was sold in 1865.
- HMS Africa was to have been a Drake-class cruiser but she was renamed HMS Good Hope (1901) in 1899, before being launched in 1901.
- HMS Africa (1905) was a King Edward VII-class battleship launched in 1905 and sold in 1920.
- HMS Africa was to have been an Audacious-class aircraft carrier. She was ordered in 1943, but was later reordered as a Malta-class carrier, before being cancelled in 1945.
- There was also an Irish hired armed cutter Africa, of 7080/94 tons burthen (bm), in Royal Navy service from 12 December 1803 to 12 January 1810.

== See also ==
- HMS Africaine
