= HMS Gibraltar Prize =

Sloop of the Royal Navy

History

France
- Name: Glaneur
- Builder: Nantes
- Captured: December 1756

Great Britain
- Name: HMS Gibraltar Prize
- Acquired: February 1757
- Decommissioned: 22 January 1761
- Fate: Sold 22 January 1761

General characteristics
- Tons burthen: 11772/94 (bm)
- Length: 63 ft 10 in (19.5 m) (overall); 59 ft 1 in (18.01 m) (keel)
- Beam: 18 ft 7 1/2 in (5.7 m)
- Depth of hold: 8 ft 2 in (2.5 m)
- Complement: 100; Later 80
- Armament: 16 guns under French service; 14, later 12 × 6-pounder guns + 12 × 1/2-pounder swivels under British service; 8 guns on 8 May 1757

HMS Gibraltar Prize, also known as HMS Gibraltar's Prize, was a sloop of the Royal Navy. She began life as the French privateer schooner Glaneur, but HMS Gibraltar captured her on 10 December 1756, or February or March 1757; prize money was paid on 3 January 1758. The Admiralty purchased her on 12 February 1757 for £795 9s and the Royal Navy took her into service under the name Gibraltar's Prize. The Admiralty sold her in 1761.

== Service ==
Gibraltar's Prize was commissioned the day after her purchase. She then was reclassified in March 1757 as an unrated tender.

On 16 April 1757, she sailed to North America from the Cove of Cork along with a fleet commanded by Vice-Admiral Francis Holburne, for Halifax in Canada. There she was left behind with several other ships – the Windsor, the Arc-En-Ciel, the Nightingale, the Speedwell and the bomb-vessel Grenado – to defend the city of Halifax, as a fleet commanded by Vice Admiral Holburne left to reconnoitre Louisbourg. She had 12 guns at the time.

Her captain at the time was John Stott, who was previously master of HMS Grafton. He was promoted to lieutenant and given command of Gibraltar Prize, and then further promoted to commander on 14 June 1757, replacing the previous commander, Lieutenant Schomberg.

By January 1758, the command had changed again: this time, to Lieutenant Robert Kerr, previously of HMS Princess Amelia.

== Fate ==
Gibraltar Prize was decommissioned and sold on 22 January 1761 at Sheerness for £135.
