= French ship Monge =

At least four ships of the French Navy have borne the name Monge:

- French corvette Monge, a corvette lost 4 November 1868
- French submarine Monge (1908), a Pluviôse-class submarine launched in 1908 and sunk in 1915
- French submarine Monge (Q144), a Redoutable-class submarine launched in 1929 and sunk in 1942
- French ship Monge (A601), a tracking ship launched in 1990
