= French ship Tonnant =

A number of ships of the French Navy have borne the name Tonnant ("Thundering"). Among them:

- French ship Tonnant (1681), a 76-gun ship of the line
- French ship Tonnant (1693), a 90-gun ship of the line
- French ship Tonnant (1743), an 80-gun ship of the line
- French ship Tonnant (1789) an 80-gun ship of the line, lead ship of her class
- French ship Tonnant (1808),
- French ship Louis-XIV (1854), an Océan-class ship of the line was laid as Tonnant
- French ironclad Tonnant, a coastal defence ship that served between 1885 and 1902.
- French submarine Le Tonnant (Q172), a Redoutable-class submarine during the Second World War (1934–1942)
- French submarine Tonnant (S614), a Redoutable-class ballistic missile submarine (1977–1999)
