= Marnes =

Marnes is the name or part of the name of three communes of France:

- Marnes, Deux-Sèvres in the Deux-Sèvres département
- Marnes-la-Coquette in the Hauts-de-Seine département
- Saint-Jouin-de-Marnes in the Deux-Sèvres département
