= French ship Georges Leygues =

At least two ships of the French Navy have been named Georges Leygues:

- French cruiser Georges Leygues, a La Galissonnière-class cruiser launched in 1936 and scrapped in 1959
- French frigate Georges Leygues, a Georges Leygues-class frigate launched in 1976 and decommissioned in 2014
