= French ship Ambitieux =

Three ships of the French Navy have borne the name Ambitieux ("ambitious"):

- French ship Ambitieux (1691), a 96-gun ship of the line burnt at La Hougue in June 1692
- French ship Ambitieux (1692), a 96-gun ship of the line
- French brig Ambitieux (1834), a brig
