= Cristhian Árabe =

Bolivian footballer (born 1991)

Personal information
- Full name: Cristhian Alexis Árabe Pedraza
- Date of birth: 25 December 1991 (age 34)
- Place of birth: Santa Cruz de la Sierra
- Height: 1.79 m (5 ft 10 in)
- Position: Midfielder

Team information
- Current team: Oriente Petrolero
- Number: 7

Youth career
- –2010: Club Blooming
- 2010–2013: Club Destroyers

Senior career*
Years	Team	Apps	(Gls)
2013–2015	Universitario de Sucre	19	(0)
2015–2020	Club Always Ready	110	(24)
2022–	Oriente Petrolero	45	(2)

International career
2019–	Bolivia	3	(0)
- * Club domestic league appearances and goals as of 00:15, 28 December 2025 (UTC)

Cristhian Alexis Árabe Pedraza (born 25 December 1991) is a Bolivian footballer who plays as a midfielder for Oriente Petrolero in the Bolivian Primera División.

== Club career ==
From Santa Cruz, Arabe started at Club Blooming and also previously played for Club Destroyers. He joined Oriente Petrolero from Club Always Ready in July 2022, having been with Always Ready since 2015. He missed most of the rest of 2022 however, after suffering a fractured kneecap, prior to returning to fitness ahead of the 2023 season. In November 2023, he required another surgery after suffering a dislocated clavicle.

== International career ==
On 3 March 2019 Arabe made his debut for the Bolivia national football team against Nicaragua.
