= French ship Volta =

Three ships of the French Navy have borne the name Volta:

- French aviso Volta, a Limier-class aviso launched in 1867 and stricken in 1892
- French submarine Volta, a Brumaire-class submarine launched in 1911 and stricken in 1922
- French destroyer Volta, a Mogador-class destroyer launched in 1936 and scuttled in 1942
