= French ship Renommée =

Thirteen ships of the French navy have borne the name Renommée ("Renown"):

== Ships named Renommée ==
- Renommée (1653), a light 1-gun frigate.
- Renommée (1661), a frigate.
- Renommée (1665), a galley.
- Renommée (1680), a galley.
- Renommée (1690), a galley.
- Renommée (1698), a 48-gun ship of the line.
- Renommée (1744), a 32-gun Sirène-class frigate, captured in 1747 by HMS Dover, renamed as HMS Renown and broken up in 1771.
- Renommée (1767), a 40-gun frigate.
- Renommée (1794), a 4-gun cutter.
- Républicaine française (1794), a 32-gun Galathée-class frigate, bore the name Renommée during her career.
- Dubois (1797), a 64-gun Victoire-class ship of the line, bore the name Renommée during her career.
- Renommée (1808), was a 40-gun Pallas-class frigate that the Royal Navy captured in 1811 and renamed HMS Java; the USS Constitution captured her in 1813 and subsequently burnt her.
- Renommée (1847), a frigate, converted to sail and steam propulsion in 1857.

== See also ==
- HMS Renown
