= French ship Algésiras =

Three ships of the French Navy have borne the name Algésiras in honour of the Battle of Algeciras:

- Algésiras (1804), a 74-gun ship of the line
- Algésiras (1823), a 74-gun ship of the line
- Algésiras (1855), a swift 90-gun ship of the line, lead ship of Algésiras-class ship of the line
