= HMS New Zealand =

Two ships of the Royal Navy have borne the name HMS New Zealand, after the country of New Zealand, a third was cancelled while under construction:

- HMS New Zealand (1904) was a King Edward VII-class battleship launched in 1904, renamed HMS Zealandia in 1911 to free the name for the new battlecruiser, and sold in 1921.
- HMS New Zealand (1911) was an Indefatigable-class battlecruiser paid for by the Dominion of New Zealand and launched in 1911. She served during the First World War and was sold in 1922.
- HMS New Zealand (D43) was to have been a Malta-class aircraft carrier. She was cancelled in 1946 while under construction.

== Battle honours ==
Ships named New Zealand have earned the following battle honours:

- Heligoland, 1914
- Dogger Bank, 1915
- Jutland, 1916
