= French ship La Galissonnière =

At least three ships of the French Navy have borne the name La Galissonnière:

- French ironclad La Galissonnière, lead ship of the La Galissonnière-class ironclad launched in 1872 and stricken in 1894
- French cruiser La Galissonnière, lead ship of the La Galissonnière-class cruiser launched in 1933 and scuttled in 1942. Raised by Italy in 1943 and renamed FR 12, she was again sunk in 1944
- French destroyer La Galissonnière, sixth and last ship of the T 53-class destroyer launched in 1960 and decommissioned in 1990.
