= French ship Lion =

At least fourteen ships of the French Navy have been named Lion:

== Ships named Lion ==
- Sauveur (1671), a 36-gun ship of the line, bore the name during her career
- Canadien (1676), a 42-gun ship of the line, bore the name during her career
- Écueil (1678), a 40-gun ship of the line, bore the name during her career
- French fireship Lion (1694), a fireship
- Lion (1751), a 64-gun ship of the line, lead ship of her class
- Lion (1794), a Téméraire-class 74-gun ship of the line renamed Marat before launch
- French corvette Lion (1794), a corvette
- Cassard (1795), a Vétéran-class 74-gun ship of the line, bore the name during her career
- Lion (1804), a Téméraire-class ship of the line launched in 1804 and scuttled and burnt in 1809
- French gunboat Lion (1885), an Aspic-class gunboat
- French trawler Lion (1916), an armed trawler, ex-Brazilian Ernestina
- Lion (1918), an armed boat
- French destroyer Lion, a Guépard-class destroyer launched in 1929 and scuttled in 1942.
- Lion (1983), a Léopard-class training ship

== Other ships with similar names ==
- Lion britannique (1781), a 27-gun fluyt, ex-Briton Lion captured from the British
- Lion Couronné (1643), a 28-gun ship of the line
- Lion Couronné (1665), a 22-gun ship of the line
- Éminent (1647), a 46-gun ship of the line, bore the name Lion de Smaland during her career
- Lion d'Or (1665), a 24-gun ship of the line, also originally named Lion rouge
- Serpent (1665), a fireship, bore the name Lion d'Or during her career
- Lion rouge (1666), a 40-gun ship of the line, possibly the captured Turkish ship Al Assad el Ahmar.
- Lion II (1917), an armed ketch
- Lion II (1939), an armed trawler

Ships named Lionne are at French ship Lionne.

== Notes and references ==
=== Bibliography ===
- Roche, Jean-Michel (2005a). Dictionnaire des bâtiments de la flotte de guerre française de Colbert à nos jours. Vol. 1. Group Retozel-Maury Millau. p. 282. ISBN 978-2-9525917-0-6. OCLC 165892922.
- Roche, Jean-Michel (2005b). Dictionnaire des bâtiments de la flotte de guerre française de Colbert à nos jours. Vol. 2. Group Retozel-Maury Millau. p. 20. ISBN 978-2-9525917-0-6. OCLC 165892922.
