= French ship Aconit =

Four ships of the French Navy have borne the name of Aconit (meaning Aconite):

- The French corvette Aconit, of the Free French Forces, which dispatched two German submarines within a few hours during the Second World War
- An Adjutant-class minesweeper, built in the United States, launched in 1953. She was sold to Tunisia as Sousse in 1966, and scrapped in 1988
- The only frigate of the F65 type, built in 1968 and commissioned in 1973. She was a prototype of the F67 type frigates. She was decommissioned in 1996
- The La Fayette-class stealth frigate Aconit, presently in service
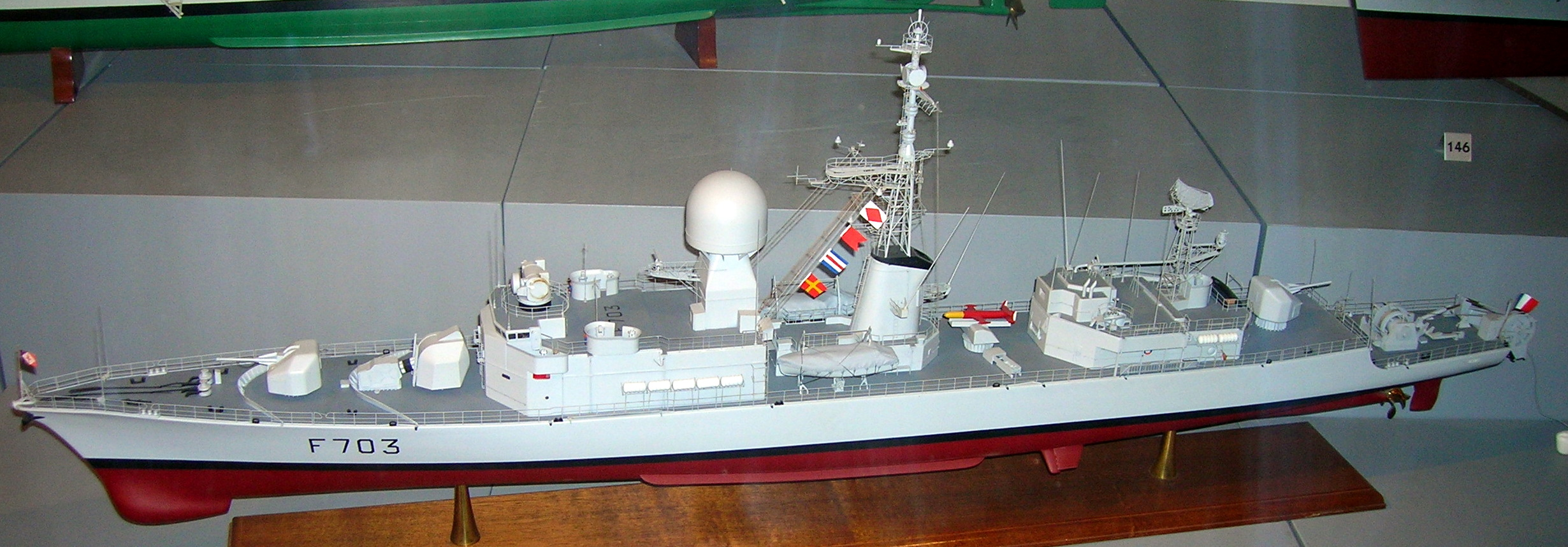
F65 type

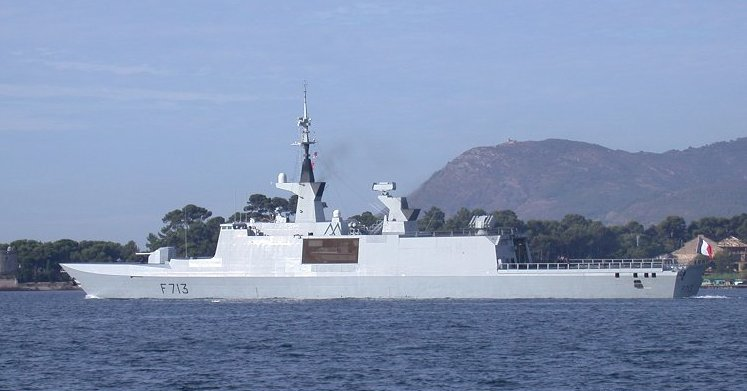
La Fayette type stealth frigate Aconit
