= French ship Milan =

A number of ships of the French Navy have been named Milan, for the Kite:

- French cutter Milan (1771–1784), a Lévrier-class cutter
- French brig Milan (1807) (1807–1809), a 16-gun brig, captured by the British and brought into Royal Navy service as HMS Achates
- French aviso Milan (1849–1865), a steam aviso
- French cruiser Milan, an unprotected cruiser launched in 1884 and struck in 1908.
- French destroyer Milan, an Aigle-class destroyer launched in 1931 and lost in 1942.
