= Italian submarine Medusa =

Medusa was the name of at least two ships of the Italian Navy and may refer to:

- Italian submarine Medusa (1911), a Medusa-class submarine launched in 1911 and sunk in 1915.
- Italian submarine Medusa (1931), an Argonauta-class submarine launched in 1931 and sunk in 1942.
