= French ship Achéron =

At least two ships of the French Navy have borne the name Achéron:

- French submarine Achéron (1929), a Redoutable-class submarine commissioned in 1932 and scuttled in 1942
- French ship Achéron (1986), a base ship for mine-clearance divers commissioned in 1987

== See also ==
- HMS Acheron
