= French ship La Fayette =

Two ships of the French Navy have borne the name La Fayette, in honour of Gilbert du Motier, marquis de La Fayette:

- The aircraft carrier La Fayette (R96), ex-USS Langley.
- La Fayette (F710) – a French stealth frigate, lead ship of her class
