= French ship La Moqueuse =

La Moqueuse has been the name of several ships in the French Navy:

- French sloop La Moqueuse, an Élan-class sloop launched in 1940 and scrapped in 1960
- French patrol vessel La Moqueuse, a P400-class patrol vessel launched in 1986 and decommissioned in 2020
