= French ship Algérien =

At least three ships of the French Navy have been named Algérien:

- French submarine Algérien, a Morse-class submarine
- French destroyer Algérien, an Arabe-class destroyer launched in 1917 and struck in 1936.
- French frigate Algérien, a Cannon-class destroyer escort launched as USS Cronin in 1943 and transferred to France in 1944. She was renamed Oise in 1962 and returned to the US Navy in 1964.
