= French ship Gapeau =

Four ships of the French Navy have borne the name Gapeau, named after the river Gapeau in southern France.

- French torpedo boat Gapeau, a torpedo boat in service 1887–1912.
- French tug Gapeau an Argens-class tug in service 1937–1942.
- French ship Gapeau (B284), a minesweeper and transport ship in service 1946–1969.
- French ship Gapeau (L-9090), an amphibious landing ship in service since 1987.
