= French ship Var =

A number of vessels of the French Navy have borne the name Var, after the river of that name.

- French corvette Var (1806), in service 1806–1809.
- French tanker Var, a Durance-class tanker, in service since 1983.
