= French ship Pégase =

Six ships of the French Navy have borne the name Pégase, in honour of Pegasus.

== Ships ==
- French ship Pégase (1781), a 74-gun ship of the line, lead ship of her class
- French ship Pégase (1795), a 74-gun Téméraire-class ship of the line
- French submarine Pégase (1930), a Redoutable-class submarine
- French minesweeper Pégase (1956), a coastal minesweeper
- French ship Pégase (1975), a ship used to test torpedoes (Note: Property of DCN, but used by the ECAN at Saint-Tropez.)
- French minehunter Pégase (1985), a Tripartite-class minehunter

== Notes and references ==
=== Bibliography ===
- Roche, Jean-Michel (2005). Dictionnaire des bâtiments de la flotte de guerre française de Colbert à nos jours. Vol. 1. Group Retozel-Maury Millau. p. 344. ISBN 978-2-9525917-0-6. OCLC 165892922.
- Roche, Jean-Michel (2005). Dictionnaire des bâtiments de la flotte de guerre française de Colbert à nos jours. Vol. 2. Group Retozel-Maury Millau. p. 385. ISBN 978-2-9525917-0-6. OCLC 165892922.
