= French ship Orion =

Three ships have been named after Orion:

- French ship Orion (1787), a 74-gun ship of the line
- French ship Orion (1813) a 74-gun ship of the line
- French submarine Orion, a submarine launched in 1931
