= HMS Gibraltar (1779) =

Brig of the Royal Navy

History

Great Britain
- Name: HMS Gibraltar
- Acquired: 1779 by purchase of an American prize
- Fate: Captured 1781

General characteristics
- Tons burthen: 85 (bm)
- Length: 63 ft 0 in (19.2 m) oa; 54 ft 0 in (16.5 m) keel
- Beam: 21 ft 0 in (6.4 m)
- Depth of hold: 7 ft 6 in (2.3 m)
- Sail plan: Brig
- Complement: 45
- Armament: 10 × 3-pounder guns

HMS Gibraltar was a Royal Navy brig, formerly the American brig Virginia. The Royal Navy acquired Gibraltar in 1779 and in May commissioned her under Lieutenant Almerick Brown. The Spanish captured her in the Mediterranean in 1781 and named her San Salvador.

== Loss ==
On 18 April 1781 Lieutenant Walter Anderson was sailing from Gibraltar to Minorca with dispatches. When Gibraltar was about 36 miles SSW of Cape Gata she sighted two Spanish xebecs. Gibraltar sailed away, with the xebecs in pursuit. After about four hours one had come up within about 50 yards and an engagement ensued. The Spaniard was able to take a position under Gibraltar's lee quarter and to rake her from there. Anderson then struck. Gibraltar's captor was the 34-gun Murciano. (Note: Murciano (which also carried the religious name of San Fulgencio), was a 467-ton (burthen) xebec launched on 30 January 1779, the first of three sister vessels (the others being Valenciano and Catalán), ordered on 16 May 1778 and all launched at Cartagena during 1779; Murciano measured 150 pies in length (the Spanish pie was 278.6 mm, about 91.4% of an English foot), 39 pies in breadth, and 14½ pies in depth of hold. She carried twenty-two 8-pounder guns in her main battery, ten 6-pounders on the quarterdeck, and two 6-pounders on her forecastle.)

== Spanish career ==
The Spanish renamed Gibraltar San Salvador. She may have participated in the Spanish attack on Gibraltar on 13–14 September 1782.

By some accounts HMS Anson recaptured her on 29 July 1800. This report appears to be in error.

On 29 June Anson and Constance captured two privateer misticos: Gibraltar and Severo (or Severino). Gibraltar was armed with four guns and had a crew of 50 men. Severo was armed with two guns and ten swivel guns, and had a crew of 26 men.

On 30 June Anson cut off two Spanish gun boats, Gibraltar and Salvador, that had been annoying the convoy she was escorting. They each mounted two 18–pounder guns in their bow, and each had eight guns of different dimensions on their sides. They were each manned by 60 men and probably sustained heavy casualties in resisting Anson. A later prize money notice suggests that the captures on 29 and 30 June are actually the same, and refer to the gunboats Cervero and Trois Hermanos.
