= French submarine Amazone (1916) =

Amazone
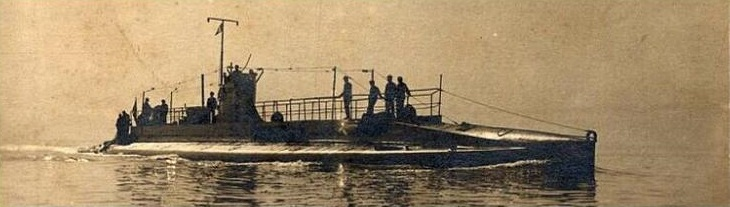
- Amazone, date unknown

History

Greece
- Name: X
- Builder: Schneider-Creusot shipyards, France
- Laid down: 1913
- Launched: August 1916
- Fate: Requisitioned by the French Navy, 30 May 1917

France
- Name: Amazone
- Completed: June 1917
- Acquired: 30 May 1917
- Fate: Stricken and sold for scrap in July 1932.

General characteristics
- Type: Submarine
- Displacement: 457 tonnes (450 long tons) (surfaced); 670 tonnes (659 long tons) (submerged)
- Length: 56.2 m (184 ft 5 in)
- Beam: 5.2 m (17 ft 1 in)
- Draught: 3 m (9 ft 10 in)
- Propulsion: 2 × diesel engines, 2,200 hp (1,641 kW); 2 × electric motors, 900 hp (671 kW)
- Speed: 17.5 knots (32.4 km/h) (surfaced); 11 knots (20 km/h) (submerged)
- Range: 2,600 nautical miles (4,800 km) at 11 knots (20 km/h); 160 nautical miles (300 km) at 5 knots (9.3 km/h) (submerged)
- Complement: 31
- Armament: 4 × 450 mm (17.7 in) torpedo tubes; 1 × 75 mm (3.0 in) deck gun

The French submarine Amazone was an Armide-class diesel-electric attack submarine built for the Greek Navy before and during World War I. It was built in the Schneider-Creusot shipyards between 1913 and 1916, but was seized during the war by the French Government before it could be sold, on 3 June 1915. Amazone operated in the Adriatic Sea during the course of World War I and was stricken from the Navy list in July 1932.

== Design ==
The Amazone was 56.2 m (184 ft 5 in) long, with a beam of 5.2 m (17 ft 1 in) and a draught of 3 m (9 ft 10 in). It had a surfaced displacement of 457 tonnes (450 long tons) and a submerged displacement of 670 tonnes (659 long tons). Propulsion while surfaced was provided by two 2,200 hp (1,641 kW) diesel motors built by Schneider-Carels and two 900 hp (671 kW) electric motors. The submarine's electrical propulsion allowed it to attain speeds of 11 knots (20 km/h; 13 mph) while submerged and 17.5 knots (32.4 km/h; 20.1 mph) on the surface. Its surfaced range was 2,600 nautical miles (4,800 km) at 11 knots (20 km/h), with a submerged range of 160 nautical miles (300 km) at 5 knots (9.3 km/h).

The submarine was armed with four 450 mm (17.7 in) torpedo tubes and a 75 mm (3.0 in) L/34 M1897 deck gun. The crew consisted of 31 officers and seamen.

== Construction and service ==
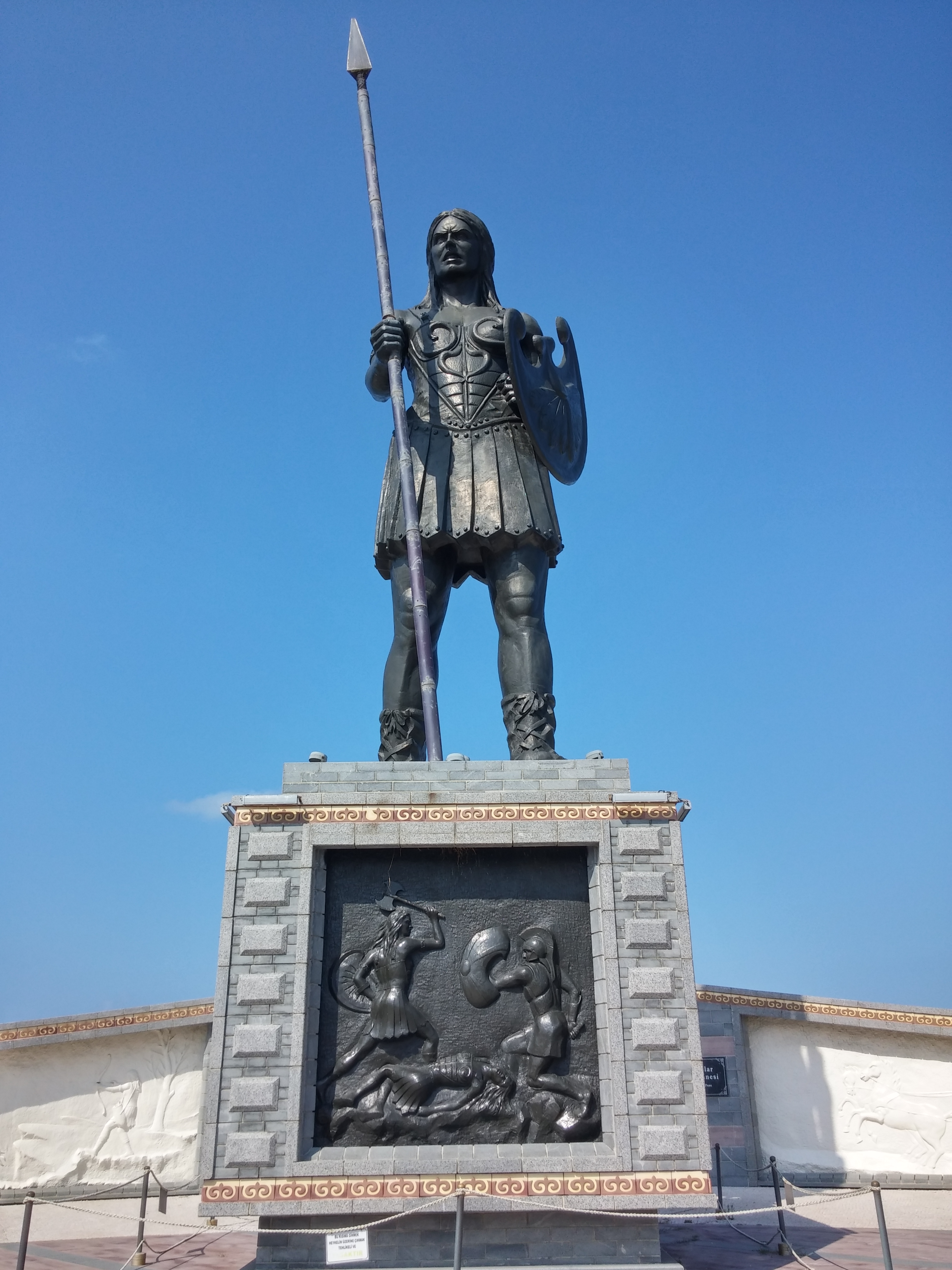
Amazone's namesake, an Amazon

Amazone was ordered by the Greek Navy in 1913, based on a design by Maxime Laubeuf. The ship, which was initially designated X, was confiscated by the French Government on 30 May 1917 during World War I.

Amazone was built in the Schneider shipyard in Chalon-sur-Saône. It was laid down in 1913, launched in August 1916, and completed in June 1917. It was named after the mythological creatures, the Amazons.

After its launching, Amazone served on the Adriatic Sea until 1918, when it was assigned to the 3rd Submarine Flotilla, based in Moudros, Greece. On 20 April 1928, she was renamed Amazone II to release the name for a new submarine, Amazone. Amazone II was struck from the Naval Register in July 1932.
