= French ship Railleuse =

Several French ships have been called Railleuse

- French frigate Railleuse (1689), a 18-gun frigate
- French frigate Railleuse (1779), a 32-gun Galathée-class frigate, captured in 1804 and became the Royal Navy prison ship HMS Antigua (1804)
- French destroyer La Railleuse, a L'Adroit-class destroyer launched in 1926
- French patrol vessel La Railleuse, a P400-class patrol vessel, decommissioned in 2011
