= French ship Tapageuse =

Tapageuse or La Tapageuse has been the name of several ships in the French Navy:

- French corvette Tapageuse (1795), a brig-corvette launched in 1795
- French patrol vessel La Tapageuse (P691) [fr], a P400-class patrol vessel launched in 1987 and decommissioned in 2013
