= French ship Africain =

Five ships of the French Navy have borne the name Africain ("African"):

== List ==
- Africain (1701), a 44-gun ship of the line, hulked in Rochefort in 1723.
- Africain (1769), a 26-gun flûte, broken up in 1780.
- Africain (1795), a 1-gun flûte, of uncertain origin in service May to September 1795 at Pasjes
- Africain (1819), a paddle-wheel steam aviso, decommissioned in Saint Louis, Senegal, in 1827.
- Africain (1832), a paddle-wheel steam aviso, decommissioned in Saint Louis, Senegal, in 1838.
- Africain (1858), a paddle-wheel steam aviso, broken up in 1878.
- Arabe (1858), named Africain 1879–1881, last mentioned 1882.

== See also ==
- French ship Africaine
- HMS Africaine
