= French ship Amarante =

Several ships of the French navy have borne the name Amarante:

- Amarante (1708), 14 guns, design by Philippe Cochois, launched 29 March 1708 at Le Havre - deleted 1724.
- Amarante (1747), corvette wrecked 1760.
- Amarante (1793), captured in 1796, and taken into service as HMS Amarante. Wrecked in 1799.
- Amarante (1915), an Amphitrite-class submarine launched in 1915 and struck in 1925.
