= French ship Jean de Vienne =

At least two ships of the French Navy have been named Jean de Vienne:

- French cruiser Jean de Vienne, a La Galissonnière-class cruiser launched in 1935 and scuttled in 1942
- French frigate Jean de Vienne, a Georges Leygues-class frigate launched in 1981
