= French ship Léopard =

At least three ships of the French Navy have been named Léopard:

- French ship Léopard (1642), a 28-gun small ship of the line launched in 1642 and passed to Spain in 1651 by her mutinous crew.
- French ship Léopard (1787), a 74-gun Téméraire-class ship of the line launched in 1787 and scuttled by fire in 1793.
- French destroyer Léopard, a Chacal-class destroyer launched in 1924 and lost in 1943.
