= French ship Lynx =

Several vessels of the French Navy have been named Lynx for the Lynx.

- HMS Conflict (1801) was launched in 1801 at Deptford. She grounded in October 1804, with the French Navy taking possession of her. In the French navy from late 1815 on she was named Lynx. As Lynx she was present at naval actions at Cadiz (1823), where she came under fire, Algiers (1830), and possibly the river Tagus (1831). She was broken up in 1834.
- French corvette Lynx (1804) (or Linx) was a 16-gun brig, name ship of her two-vessel class of brigs, and launched at Bayonne on 17 April 1804. The British captured her in 1807 and named her HMS Heureux. After service in the Caribbean that earned her crew two medals, including one for a boat action in which her captain was killed, she was laid up in 1810 and sold in 1814.
- French submarine Lynx was a Naïade-class submarine launched in 1903 and sold for scrapping in 1920
- French destroyer Lynx was a Chacal-class destroyer (contre-torpilleur) built for the French Navy during the 1920s. The Chacals were regarded as obsolete by 1935 and Lynx became a training ship for the torpedo school at Toulon that year. She was assigned convoy escort duties in the Atlantic after the start of World War II in September 1939. In July 1940, the ship was present when the British attacked the French fleet at Mers-el-Kébir, but managed to escape without damage. After she reached Toulon, Lynx was placed in reserve where she remained for the next two years. On 27 November 1942, she was scuttled at Toulon when the Germans attempted to capture the French ships there. Her wreck was salvaged in 1944, but she was not broken up until 1948.
