= French ship Francis Garnier =

At least three ships of the French Navy have been named after the explorer Francis Garnier:

- French destroyer Francis Garnier, a Bouclier-class destroyer launched in 1912 and stricken in 1926
- French sloop Francis Garnier, previously the Italian sloop Eritrea she was acquired in 1948 and expended in a nuclear test in 1966
- French landing ship Francis Garnier, a BATRAL-class landing ship launched in 1973 and stricken in 2011
