= French ship Amiral Charner =

Four ships of the French Navy have borne the name Amiral Charner in honour of admiral Léonard Charner:

- Amiral Charner, an armoured cruiser
- Amiral Charner, an auxiliary cruiser, sunk by U-41
- Amiral Charner, a Bougainville-class aviso
- Amiral Charner, a Commandant Rivière-class frigate
