= French destroyer Vauquelin =

At least two ships of the French Navy have been named Vauquelin: for Jean Vauquelin

- French destroyer Vauquelin (1932), a Vauquelin-class destroyer launched in 1932 and scuttled in 1942
- French destroyer Vauquelin (D628), a T 47-class destroyer launched in 1955 and expended as a target in 2004
