= Paul-Henry de Belvèze =

French sailor

- Born: 11 March 1801; Montauban, France
- Died: 8 February 1875 (aged 73); Toulon, France
- Occupation: Naval Officer
- Known for: Playing a prominent part in establishing relations between France and Canada

Paul-Henry de Belvèze (11 March 1801 – 8 February 1875) was a French sailor who was given the mission by Napoleon III's government of renewing commercial relations with Canada. De Belvèze undertook this task successfully and his visit to the country resulted in greatly improved relations between the two nations. A longer term consequence of the efforts of de Belvèze was the establishment of a French consulate at Quebec.

== Origins ==
De Belvèze was descended from an old family of Languedoc; b. 11 March 1801 at Montauban, son of Antoine-Jean-François de Belvèze and Marie-Josèphe-Jeanne Garrigues de Saint-Fauste; d. 8 Feb. 1875 in his mansion at Toulon.

== Naval career ==
A former pupil of the École Polytechnique, young Paul-Henry de Belvèze joined the navy in 1823 and was subsequently put in charge of various expeditions, notably to South America, Europe, and the Holy Land. In 1855, while he was cruising in the Gulf of Saint Lawrence, captaining La Capricieuse, as "commander of the French forces in the waters of Newfoundland," Napoleon III's government decided to entrust to him the mission of renewing relations with Canada, a mission which, in the terms of the official mandate, was to be above all "commercial, with no diplomatic character."

== Canadian mission ==
This objective was exceeded: in Canada East where deeply moved spectators watched the return of the French colours, the sailor's passage was a triumph; towns such as Ottawa, Kingston, and Toronto, despite some reservations, felt obliged to extend a welcome to the French delegation, which was invariably correct and sometimes warm. The moment seemed well chosen: Great Britain had just abolished the former customs duties which hitherto had made trade between Canada and abroad impracticable. Moreover, relations between France and England had never been better; the French sovereigns had been the guests of Queen Victoria in 1850, and the latter, in that same year 1855, was to return their visit on the occasion of the universal exposition in Paris, at which Canada had an exhibit.

The mission's success must be attributed to a large extent also to the personality of the commander – a “very well educated, extremely capable” man, as one of his superiors had said of him in 1831. In 1848 he was judged to be “one of the captains best fitted to command.” A true meridional, Belvèze had the natural gifts of a brilliant speaker, but in him spontaneity was held in check by a wisdom and tact worthy of a professional diplomat. De Belvèze was retired in 1861 without obtaining the promotion to which he thought he was entitled. He died in 1875 in his mansion in Toulon.

== Long-term effects ==
One of the practical results of his mission was the establishment in 1859 of a consulate at Quebec, where France had been represented only by an agent named Edward Ryan. This symbolized a new period of harmony between France and England.
