= Medusa Lake (Antarctica) =

Lake in Antarctica

- Location within Antarctica
- Location: Princess Elizabeth Land, East Antarctica
- Coordinates: 68°34′39″S 78°14′48″E
- Surface area: 16 hectares (40 acres)
- Surface elevation: 28 metres (92 ft)

The Medusa Lake is a slightly brackish lake on the Ingrid Christensen Coast of the Princess Elizabeth Land in East Antarctica. In the Vestfold Hills, the lake is located east of the Ephyra Lake, with which the lake is temporarily connected via a 1 m wide and 0.5 m deep canal. Its bank length is 3.5 km.

The Antarctic Names Committee of Australia named the lake in 2006 Medusa Lake because of the similarity of its shape to a medusa.

== Literature ==
- John Stewart: Antarctica – An Encyclopedia. Bd. 2, McFarland & Co., Jefferson and London 2011, ISBN 978-0-7864-3590-6, p. 1022
