= French ship Montcalm =

Four ships of the French Navy have been named Montcalm in honour of the 18th century Marshal Marquess Louis de Montcalm de Saint Véran:

- French ironclad Montcalm, 1865–1891
- French cruiser Montcalm (1900), 1900–1926
- French cruiser Montcalm (1935), 1933–1969, which served in the Free French Forces
- French frigate Montcalm (D642), 1975, a Georges Leygues-class frigate
