= French ship Ouragan =

At least two ships of the French Navy have been named Ouragan:

- French destroyer Ouragan, a Bourrasque-class destroyer launched in 1924 and scrapped in 1949
- French landing platform dock Ouragan, an Ouragan-class landing platform dock launched in 1963 and stricken in 2007
