= French ship Orage =

At least two ships of the French Navy have been named Orage:

- French destroyer Orage, a Bourrasque-class destroyer launched in 1924 and sunk in 1940
- French landing platform dock Orage, an Ouragan-class landing platform dock launched in 1967 and sold for scrap in 2017
