= French ship Henri Poincaré =

At least two ships of the French Navy have borne the name Henri Poincaré:

- French submarine Henri Poincaré, a Redoutable-class submarine commissioned in 1931 and scuttled in 1942
- French ship Henri Poincaré (1968), a test and measurement vessel in service from 1968 to 1991
