= Armide-class submarine =

Class of diesel-electric submarines for Greek and Japanese Navies

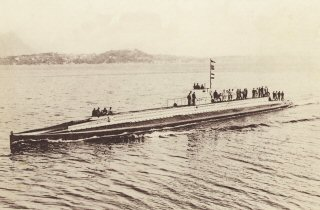
- Armide, date unknown

Class overview
- Name: Armide class
- Operators: French Navy
- Preceded by: Gustave Zédé class
- Succeeded by: Amphitrite class
- Built: 1912 – 1918
- Planned: 3
- Completed: 3
- Retired: 3

General characteristics
- Type: Submarine
- Displacement: 457 tonnes (450 long tons) (surfaced); 670 tonnes (659 long tons) (submerged)
- Length: 56.2 m (184 ft 5 in)
- Beam: 5.2 m (17 ft 1 in)
- Draught: 3 m (9 ft 10 in)
- Propulsion: 2 × diesel engines, 2,200 hp (1,641 kW); 2 × electric motors, 900 hp (671 kW)
- Speed: 17.5 knots (32.4 km/h) (surfaced); 11 knots (20 km/h) (submerged)
- Range: 2,600 nautical miles (4,800 km) at 11 knots (20 km/h); 160 nautical miles (300 km) at 5 knots (9.3 km/h) (submerged)
- Complement: 31
- Armament: 4 - 6 × 450 mm (17.7 in) torpedo tubes; 1 × 75 mm (3.0 in) OR; 1 × 47 mm (1.9 in) Hotchkiss deck gun

The Armide-class submarines were a class of three diesel-electric submarines built for the Greek and Japanese Navies before and during World War I. They were built in the Schneider-Creusot shipyards 1913 to 1918, but were seized during the war by the French government before they could be sold. The Armide class ships operated in the Mediterranean during the course of World War I and were stricken from the Navy list between 1928 and 1935.

== Design ==
56.2 m (184 ft 5 in) long, with a beam of 5.2 m (17 ft 1 in) and a draught of 3 m (9 ft 10 in), the submarines had a surfaced displacement of 457 tonnes (450 long tons) and a submerged displacement of 670 tonnes (659 long tons). Propulsion while surfaced was provided by two 2,200 hp (1,641 kW) diesel motors built by the Swiss manufacturer Schneider-Carels and two 900 hp (671 kW) electric motors. The submarines' electrical propulsion allowed it to attain speeds of 11 knots (20 km/h; 13 mph) while submerged and 17.5 knots (32.4 km/h; 20.1 mph) on the surface. Their surfaced range was 2,600 nautical miles (4,800 km) at 11 knots (20 km/h) with a submerged range of 160 nautical miles (300 km) at 5 knots (9.3 km/h).

The ships were armed with 4 to 6 (depending on the ship) 450 mm (17.7 in) torpedo tubes and 1 × 47 mm (1.9 in) L/50 M1902 Hotchkiss or 75 mm (3.0 in) L/34 M1897 deck gun. The crew of one ship consisted of 31 officers and seamen.

== Ships ==
Three Armide-class submarines were built in the Schneider-Creusot shipyards, France. Two ships were laid down in 1912 and the third in 1913. The first submarine was launched in 1915 and the other two in 1916. Armide was completed in 1916 and the others in 1917.

Armide-class submarines
Name	Laid down	Launched	Completed	Fate
Armide	1912	July 1915	June 1916	Stricken in July 1932.
Antigone	1912	October 1916	January 1917	Stricken in May 1936.
Amazone	1913	August 1916	June 1917	Stricken in August 1935.
