= French ship Boudeuse =

Boudeuse or La Boudeuse has been the name of several ships in the French Navy:

- French frigate Boudeuse (1766), launched in 1766 and broken up in 1800
- French gunboat Boudeuse (1796), launched in 1796
- French gunboat Boudeuse (1916) [fr], an Ardent-class gunboat launched in 1916 and sold to Romania in 1920
- French sloop La Boudeuse (F744) [fr], an Élan-class sloop launched in 1940 and captured by Italy in 1942; later in German service and scuttled in 1945
- French patrol vessel La Boudeuse (P683) [fr], a P400-class patrol vessel launched in 1984 and decommissioned in 2011
