= French ship Espadon =

Three submarines of the French Navy have borne the name Espadon (meaning Swordfish):

- French submarine Espadon (1901), a Sirène-class submarine launched in 1901 and stricken in 1919
- French submarine Espadon (1926), a Requin-class submarine launched in 1926 and scuttled in 1943
- French submarine Espadon (S637), a French Narval-class submarine launched in 1958 and preserved as a museum ship in 1987
