= French ship Dupleix =

Four ships of the French Navy have been named Dupleix in honour of the 18th century Governor of Pondichéry and Gouverneur Général of the French possessions in India marquess Joseph François Dupleix:

- A Dupleix, a corvette (1856–1887) famous for her involvement in the Japanese revolution
- Dupleix, a 7,700-tonne armoured cruiser (1900–1919)
- Dupleix, a 10,000-tonne cruiser (1929–1942)
- The present Dupleix is a F70 type anti-submarine frigate

At least three French merchant ships have also borne the name:

- A steamship of 1,409 tons, which operated between Sydney and Noumea between 1883 and 1889, when it was sold, and renamed Jubilee.
- A three-masted barque (1901–1917) sunk by the German commerce raider Seeadler on the 5 March 1917
- A cargo ship (1914–1942) sunk in the Pacific by a Japanese submarine
