= French ship Marne =

A number of vessels of the French Navy have borne the name Marne, after the river of that name.

- French gabare Marne, in service from 1746 to 1753.
- French flûte Marne, launched in 1806.
- French corvette Marne, in service 1826–1841.
- French transport Marne, in service 1855–1878.
- French aviso Marne, a Marne-class aviso, Min service 1916–1945.
- French dredger Marne, in service 1946–1957.
- French tanker Marne, a Durance-class tanker, in service since 1987.
