= French ship Arabe =

At least two ships of the French Navy have been named Arabe:

- French destroyer Arabe, an Arabe-class destroyer launched in 1917 and struck in 1936.
- French frigate Arabe, a Cannon-class destroyer escort launched as USS Samuel. S. Miles and transferred to France in 1950. She was broken up in 1968.
