= French ship Aquitaine =

Two ships of the French Navy have borne the name Aquitaine in honour of the region of Aquitaine:

- Aquitaine (1915), an auxiliary ship converted from a civilian steamer during the First World War.
- Aquitaine the lead ship of the FREMM multipurpose frigate class; commissioned on 23 November 2012.
