= French ship Méduse =

A number of ships of the French Navy have borne the name Méduse, after the Medusa. The best-known is arguable the 1810 frigate Méduse, of Théodore Géricault's Raft of the Medusa fame.

== Ships ==
- Méduse (1699), a 30-gun Hermione-class frigate
- Méduse (1723), a 16-gun corvette
- Méduse (1727), a 16-gun frigate
- Méduse (1782), a 40-gun Danae-class frigate launched in 1782 and burnt by accident in 1797. She was the lead ship of the Méduse sub-type.
- Méduse (1797), a frigate.
- Méduse (1810), a 40-gun Pallas-class frigate launched in 1810 and wrecked in 1816. Her wreck inspired Théodore Géricault's Raft of the Medusa.
- Méduse (1904), a Naïade-class submarine
- Méduse (1916), formerly the Spanish trawler Torremolinos, purchased by the Navy and used as an auxiliary patrol ship.
- Méduse (1930), a Diane-class submarine launched in 1930 and wrecked in 1942.
- Méduse (1964), a support ship for minesweeping frogmen.

== See also ==
- Medusa (1797), a galley captured at Venice.
- Méduse II (1939), a minesweeper.

== Notes and references ==
=== Bibliography ===
- Roche, Jean-Michel (2005). Dictionnaire des bâtiments de la flotte de guerre française de Colbert à nos jours. Vol. 1. Group Retozel-Maury Millau. p. 241-242. ISBN 978-2-9525917-0-6. OCLC 165892922.
- Roche, Jean-Michel (2005). Dictionnaire des bâtiments de la flotte de guerre française de Colbert à nos jours. Vol. 2. Group Retozel-Maury Millau. p. 250. ISBN 978-2-9525917-0-6. OCLC 165892922.
