= French ship Jauréguiberry =

Two ships of the French Navy have borne the name Jauréguiberry, in honour of Bernard Jauréguiberry:

- Jauréguiberry (1893–1934), a battleship
- Jauréguiberry (D637) (1955–1992), a destroyer

== Sources and references ==
- NetMarine
