= HMS Gibraltar (1754) =

British ship

HMS Gibraltar was a twenty gun sixth-rate ship was built at Portsmouth dockyard and launched August 1754 with a crew complement of 160. She was 108 x 30.5 feet and 430 tons by the builders estimate

Admiral John Montagu reports HMS Gibraltar sailed from Boston to Lisbon in her way to England, June 28, 1773.

HMS Gibraltar was broken up at Portsmouth, November 18, 1773.
