= HMS Africaine =

Two ships of the Royal Navy have been named HMS Africaine:

- HMS Africaine was a 38-gun fifth-rate frigate, previously the French L'Africaine. She was captured in 1801 by HMS Phoebe, and was broken up in 1816.
- HMS Africaine (1827) was a 46-gun fifth-rate frigate launched in 1827. She was sold as a hulk to Trinity House in 1867 and was broken up in 1903.

== See also ==
- HMS Africa
- French ship Africaine
