= French submarine Armide =

Armide
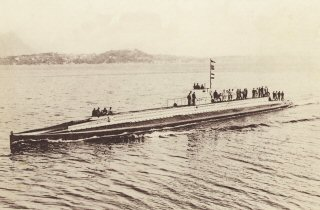
- Armide in 1922 or 1923.

History

Japan
- Name: No. 14
- Builder: Schneider-Creusot shipyards
- Laid down: 1912
- Fate: Requisitioned by the French Navy, 3 June 1915

France
- Name: Armide
- Launched: July 1915
- Completed: June 1916
- Fate: Stricken and sold for scrap in July 1932.

General characteristics
- Type: Submarine
- Displacement: 457 long tons (464 t) (surfaced); 670 long tons (681 t) (submerged)
- Length: 56.2 m (184 ft 5 in)
- Beam: 5.2 m (17 ft 1 in)
- Draught: 3 m (9 ft 10 in)
- Propulsion: 2 × diesel engines, 2,200 hp (1,641 kW); 2 × electric motors, 900 hp (671 kW)
- Speed: 17.5 knots (32.4 km/h) (surfaced); 11 knots (20 km/h) (submerged)
- Range: 2,600 nautical miles (4,800 km) at 11 knots (20 km/h); 160 nautical miles (300 km) at 5 knots (9.3 km/h) (submerged)
- Complement: 31
- Armament: 6 × 450 mm (17.7 in) torpedo tubes; 1 × 47 mm (1.9 in) Hotchkiss deck gun

Armide was a submarine ordered by the Japanese Navy from the Schneider-Creusot shipyard before World War I but was requisitioned by the French government before it was launched. Armide operated in the Mediterranean during the course of World War I and was stricken from the Navy list in July 1932.

== Design ==
Armide had a surfaced displacement of 457 long tons (464 t) and a submerged displacement of 670 long tons (681 t). Her dimensions were 56.2 m (184 ft 5 in) long, with a beam of 5.2 m (17 ft 1 in) and a draught of 3 m (9 ft 10 in). Propulsion while surfaced was provided by two diesel motors built by the Swiss manufacturer Schneider-Carels producing in total 2,200 bhp (1,641 kW) and for submerged running two electric motors producing in total 900 hp (671 kW). Her maximum speed was 17.5 knots (32.4 km/h; 20.1 mph) on the surface and 11 knots (20 km/h; 13 mph) while submerged with a surfaced range of 2,600 nautical miles (4,800 km) at 11 knots (20 km/h) and a submerged range of 160 nautical miles (300 km) at 5 knots (9.3 km/h).

Armide was armed with six 450 mm (17.7 in) torpedo tubes and a 47 mm (1.9 in) L/50 M1902 Hotchkiss deck gun. The crew of the submarine consisted of 31 officers and seamen.

== Service ==
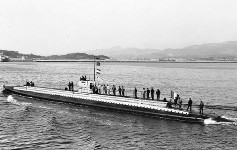
Armide

Armide was ordered in 1911 by the Imperial Japanese Navy and was designed by Maxime Laubeuf. The ship was to receive the number 14 in Japan (第 14 号艦) but it was requisitioned by the French government on 3 June 1915, after which the Japanese themselves built a replacement No 14 to the same design, ordering the diesel engines from France.

The Armide was built in the Schneider shipyard in Chalon-sur-Saône, France. The keel was laid down in 1912, it was launched in July 1915, and was completed in June 1916.

Armide operated in the Mediterranean during the course of World War I and was stricken from the Navy list in July 1932. Armide was given the pennant number of SD 2.
