= French ship Africaine =

Five ships of the French Navy have carried the name Africaine:

== List ==
- Africaine, a felucca (1664)
- Africaine, a Preneuse-class frigate (1798–1816)
- Africaine, the renamed Ems, was a 44-gun frigate wrecked in 1822
- French bateau Africaine (1827) (1827–1833), was a balancelle or bateau purchased at Toulon in 1827, decommissioned in 1833, and struck in 1835.
- Africaine (1839–72), a 40-gun frigate that also served as a transport, convict transport, and service craft. She was struck from the rolls in 1867 while serving as a storage hulk at Martinique. She was broken up in 1872.
- Africaine, an Aurore-class submarine, c.1940s to 1963

== Other ==
- Africaine, a French 20-gun ship whose seizure by a British privateer in 1804 off Charleston gave rise to an important court case that helped define the extent of U.S. territorial waters.

== See also ==
- French ship Africain - different spelling
- HMS Africaine, two ships of the Royal Navy
