= Duguay-Trouin (disambiguation) =

René Duguay-Trouin (1673–1736) was a French privateer and admiral.

Duguay-Trouin may also refer to:

- French ship Duguay-Trouin, several ships of the French Navy
- Duguay-Trouin (French privateer), several ships that the Royal Navy captured in the late 18th and early 19th centuries
- Duguay-Trouin-class cruiser, a French class of light cruisers built after World War I
- French submarine Duguay-Trouin (S636), part of the latest Barracuda-class of nuclear attack submarines
