= Duguay =

Duguay is a surname. Notable people with the surname include:

- Calixte Duguay, CM (born 1939), multi-disciplinarian Canadian Artist
- Christian Duguay (actor) (born 1970), American comic actor
- Christian Duguay (director) (born 1957), Canadian director
- Joseph Duguay (1816–1891), Quebec merchant and political figure
- Joseph Nestor Duguay (1846–1907), businessman and political figure in Quebec
- Joseph-Léonard Duguay (1900–1946), Member of the Canadian House of Commons and the Legislative Assembly of Quebec
- Julien Duguay (born 1992), Canadian businessman and jeweler
- Léo Duguay (born 1944), Progressive Conservative party member of the Canadian House of Commons
- Mathieu Duguay (born 1937), Canadian musician and teacher
- Nathaniel Dumoulin Duguay (born 1999), Canadian football player
- Normand Duguay (born 1941), former Canadian politician in the National Assembly of Quebec
- Rachel Duguay (born 1975), American actress, voice actress, comedian, and television writer
- Raôul Duguay (born 1939), artist, poet, musician, and political activist in the Canadian province of Quebec
- Rodolphe Duguay (1891–1973), Canadian painter and printmaker
- Roger Duguay (born 1963), former Canadian politician and Roman Catholic priest
- Ron Duguay (1957–2026), Canadian professional ice hockey player and coach
- Shirley Duguay (1962–1994), Canadian murder victim
- Yvette Duguay (1932–1986), American actress
- René Duguay-Trouin, (1673–1736), famous French corsair of Saint-Malo

== See also ==
- French cruiser Duguay-Trouin (1923), the lead ship of a class of French light cruisers, launched in the early 1920s
- French frigate Duguay-Trouin (D 611), F67 type large high-sea frigates of the French Marine Nationale
- French ship Duguay-Trouin, a 74-gun ship of the line Duguay Trouin (1793–1794)
- French ship Duguay-Trouin (1800) or HMS Implacable (1805), 74-gun third-rate ship of the line of the Royal Navy
- Duguay-Trouin-class cruiser light cruisers were the first major French warships built after World War I
