= T 53-class destroyer =

Class of destroyers built for French navy

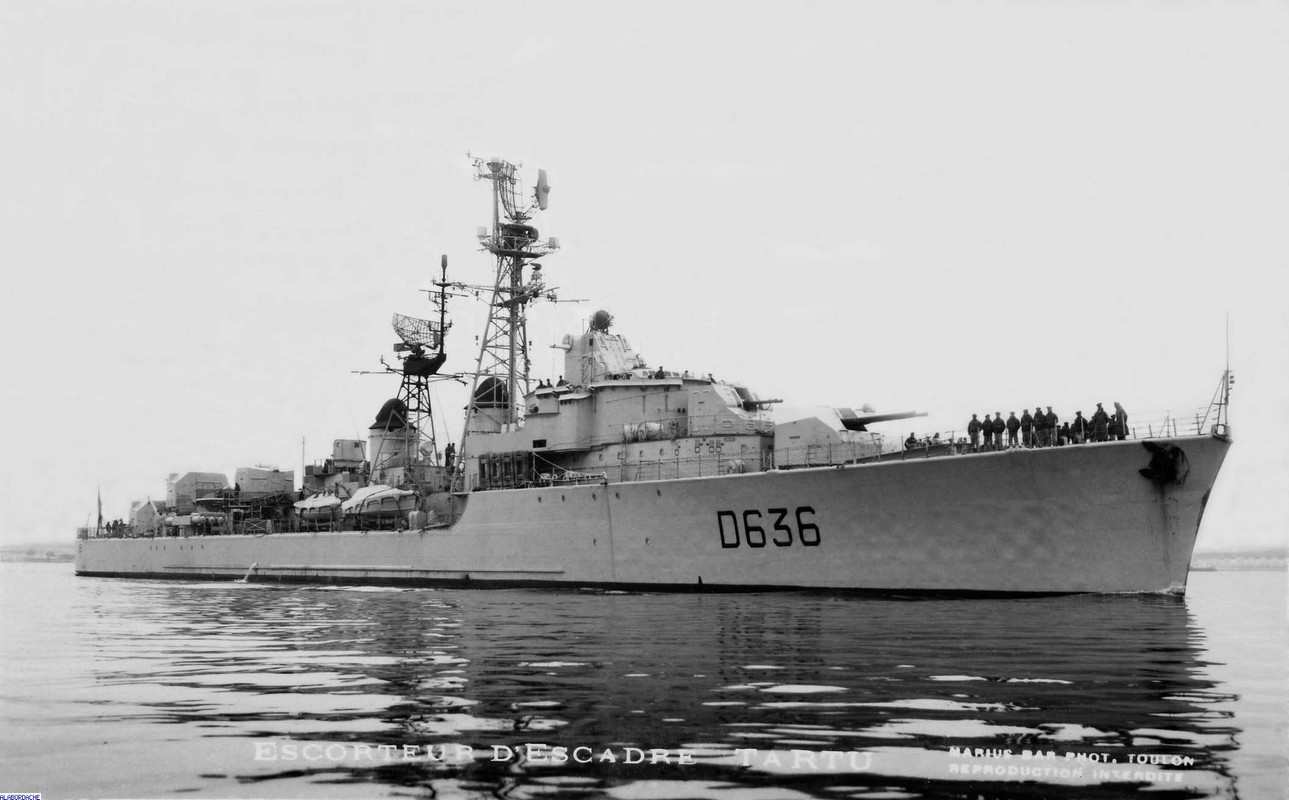

Class overview
- Builders: Arsenal de Brest; Arsenal de Lorient; Forges et Chantiers de la Gironde; Ateliers et Chantiers de Bretagne
- Operators: French Navy
- Preceded by: T 47 class
- Succeeded by: Aconit
- Subclasses: T 56 class; Anti-submarine and anti-air variants after refit
- In commission: 1957–1992
- Completed: 6
- Retired: 6

General characteristics
- Type: Destroyer
- Displacement: 2,750 long tons (2,794 t) standard; 3,740 long tons (3,800 t) full load
- Length: 128.6 m (421 ft 11 in)
- Beam: 12.7 m (41 ft 8 in)
- Draught: 5.4 m (17 ft 9 in)
- Propulsion: 4 boilers, Geared turbines, 63,000 hp (46,979 kW), 2 shafts
- Speed: 34 knots (63 km/h; 39 mph)
- Range: 5,000 nmi (9,300 km; 5,800 mi) at 18 kn (33 km/h; 21 mph)
- Complement: 347: 19 officers; 328 enlisted
- Sensors & processing systems: DRBV31 surface sentry and navigation radar; 2 DRBC30 fire control radars; DRBI10B altimetry radar; DRBV22A combined sentry radar; DUBV 1B sonar; DUBA 1B sonar
- Armament: As built: 6 × 127 mm (5 in) guns (3 × 2); 6 × 57mm/60 modèle 1951 guns (3 × 2); 4 × 20 mm (0.79 in) guns (4 × 1); 6 × Bofors 375 mm (14.8 in) ASW rocket launcher (1 × 6); 12 × 550 mm (21.7 in) torpedo tubes (4 × 3)

The T 53 class were the second group of destroyers built for the French Navy after World War II. These ships were a modified version of the T 47-class destroyers. The main difference with the preceding ships was the provision of improved air warning and tracking radars as well as an anti-submarine mortar. The ships were built between 1957 and 1958 and were decommissioned in the late 1970s or early 1980s. A single modified ship La Galissonnière was built as a trials ship for a new generation of French weapons. This ship was designated as the T 56 class.

== Modifications ==
In 1972–73 two of the class were substantially modified:

- Duperré was completely rearmed with a Model 1968 100 mm (4 in) main gun, four Exocet MM38 missiles, two quadruple L5 torpedo launchers, and two 20 mm AA cannon. She was also fitted with a helipad to carry a Lynx WG13 helicopter.
- Forbin had her forward 57 mm turret removed, and her aft 127 mm turret was replaced by a helipad. She was then principally used as a naval aviation training ship alongside the helicopter cruiser Jeanne d'Arc.

== La Galissonnière ==
La Galissonnière differed slightly in specification from the rest of the class as she was built specifically to test the Malafon anti-submarine missile.

- Length : 128 m (419 ft 11 in)
- Beam : 12 m (39 ft 4 in)
- Draught : 5 m (16 ft 5 in)
- Complement: 272
- 2 × Model 1953 100 mm (4 in) guns (2×1)
- 1 × Malafon anti-submarine missile launcher (13 missiles)
- 6 × 550 mm (21.7 in) torpedo tubes (2×3)
- 1 × quadruple 305 mm (12 in) anti-submarine mortar
- 2 × 20 mm AA cannon
- 1 × Alouette II or Alouette III helicopter

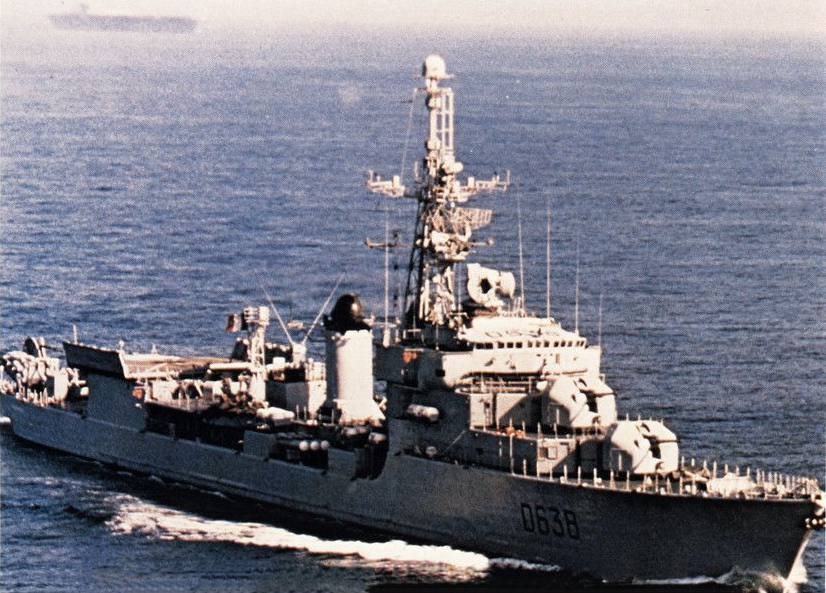
La Galissonnière in 1983.

== Ships ==
Pennant	Name	Named after	Builder	Commissioned	Fate
D633	Duperré	Guy-Victor Duperré	Arsenal de Lorient	8 October 1957	Trials ship for Cormoran I sonar, 1967–71; Rearmed 1972; Decommissioned 1 June 1992. As of 2012 at Landévennec awaiting demolition.
D634	La Bourdonnais	Bertrand-François Mahé de La Bourdonnais	Arsenal de Brest	3 March 1958	Decommissioned July 1976; Sunk by an Exocet SM39 from the submarine Ouessant, May 1992
D635	Forbin	Claude de Forbin	Arsenal de Brest	1 February 1958	Converted to helicopter training ship, 1973; Decommissioned 1 June 1981; Sunk as a target off Brest, 17 May 1999
D636	Tartu	Jean-François Tartu	AC Bretagne	5 February 1958	Decommissioned December 1979; Sunk, 80 miles off Lorient, 9 December 1998
D637	Jauréguiberry	Bernard Jauréguiberry	FC de la Gironde	15 July 1958	Decommissioned 16 September 1977; Sunk by Exocet MM40 missile off the Île du Levant, 30 May 1986
D638	La Galissonnière	Roland-Michel Barrin de La Galissonière	Arsenal de Lorient	11 July 1962	Decommissioned 20 April 1990; Scrapped in Ghent, Belgium in 2015.

== See also ==
- List of Escorteurs of the French Navy

== Bibliography ==
- Conway's All the World's Fighting Ships 1947–1995
- Jordan, John (2021). "T 53 Duperré". In Jordan, John (ed.). Warship 2021. Oxford, UK: Osprey Publishing. pp. 180–182. ISBN 978-1-4728-4779-9.
