= English ship Dragon (1647) =

History

Commonwealth of England
- Name: Dragon
- Ordered: 9 January 1647
- Builder: Henry Goddard, Chatham Dockyard
- Launched: 1647
- Commissioned: 1650
- Honours and awards: Dungeness 1652; Portland 1653; The Gabbard 1653; Scheveningen 1653

Kingdom of England
- Name: Dragon
- Acquired: May 1660
- Honours and awards: Lowestoffe 1665; Four Days' Battle 1666; Orfordness 1666; Bugia 1671; Barfleur 1692

Great Britain
- Acquired: 1707 Act of Union
- Fate: Wrecked, 16 March 1712

General characteristics as built
- Class & type: 38-gun fourth rate
- Tons burthen: 414 72/94 bm
- Length: 120 ft 0 in (36.6 m) gundeck; 96 ft 0 in (29.3 m) keel for tonnage
- Beam: 28 ft 6 in (8.7 m)
- Depth of hold: 14 ft 3 in (4.3 m)
- Sail plan: ship-rigged
- Complement: 150 – 1652; 160 – 1653; 130 – 1660; 230/200/150 – 1666
- Armament: as built; 38/32 guns various types; 1666; 12 × culverins; 20 × demi-culverins; 8 × sakers; 1667; 12 × culverins (LD); 20 × 8-pdrs guns (UD); 4 × sakers (QD)

General characteristics after 1689-90 rebuild
- Class & type: 46-gun fourth rate ship of the line
- Tons burthen: 530 79/94 bm
- Length: 118 ft 11 in (36.2 m) gundeck; 99 ft 0 in (30.2 m) keel for tonnage
- Beam: 31 ft 9 in (9.7 m)
- Depth of hold: 12 ft 2 in (3.7 m)
- Sail plan: ship-rigged
- Complement: 220
- Armament: 1696 survey; 18 × 12-pdrs; 20 × 8-pdrs; 8 × sakers; 1703 Establishment; 20/18 × 12-pdr guns (8.5 ft) (LD); 20/18 × 6-pdrs guns (8 ft) (UD); 6/4 × 6-pdrs guns (7 ft) (UD); 2/2 × 6-pdrs guns (8 ft) (Fc)

General characteristics after 1707 rebuild
- Class & type: 46-54-gun fourth rate
- Tons burthen: 719 73/94 tons bm
- Length: 130 ft 0 in (39.6 m) (gundeck); 108 ft 0 in (32.9 m) (keel)
- Beam: 35 ft 0 in (10.7 m)
- Depth of hold: 14 ft 0 in (4.3 m)
- Sail plan: Full-rigged ship
- Complement: 185 (peacetime) – 280 (wartime)
- Armament: 46 (peacetime) – 54 (wartime) guns comprising: 22/20 × 12-pounder guns (LD); 22/18 × 6-pounder guns (UD); 4 × 6-pounder guns (QD); 2 × 6-pounder guns (Fc); Forecastle: 2 × 6p-pounder guns

Dragon was a 38-gun fourth rate of the English Navy; she became part of the Royal Navy after the Restoration, built by the Master Shipwright Henry Goddard at Chatham and launched in 1647. She was the first frigate to be built at Chatham (the term 'frigate' during this period referred to a vessel designed for fast sailing, with a low superstructure, rather than a role which did not develop until the following century).

Dragon was the fourth named vessel since it was used for a ship of 100 ton bm, in service from 1512 to 1514

== Construction and specifications ==
She was built at Chatham Dockyard under the guidance of Master Shipwright Henry Goddard. She was the first 'frigate' built at Chatham and launched in 1647. Her dimensions were gundeck 120 feet 0 inches (36.6 metres) with 96 feet 0 inches (29.3 metres)for keel with a breadth of 28 feet 6 inches (8.7 metres) and a depth of hold of 14 feet 3 inches (4.3 metres). Her tonnage was 414 72/94 tons.

Her gun armament in 1647 was 38 (wartime)/32 (peacetime) guns. In 1666 her armament was 42 (wartime)/32 (peacetime) and consisted of twenty-two culverins, (Note: The culverin was a gun of 4,500 pounds with a 5.5-inch bore firing a 17.5-pound shot with a twelve-pound powder charge) twenty demi-culverines, (Note: The demi-culverin was a gun of 3,400 pounds with a four-inch bore firing a 9.5-pound shot with an eight-pound powder charge) eight sakers. (Note: The sacar or saker was a gun of 1,400 pounds with a 3.5-inch bore firing a 5.5-pound shot with a 5.5-pound powder charge) In 1677 her armament was established as 46 guns consisting of twenty-two culverins, twenty 6-pounder guns(sakers), (Note: The 6-pounder was a captured Dutch gun used in place of sakers) and four sakers on the quarterdeck. Her manning was 150 personnel in 1652 and rose to 160 a year later. By 1660 her manning had dropped to 130 personnel.

== Commissioned service ==
=== Service in the English Civil War and Commonwealth Navy ===
She was commissioned into the Parliamentary Naval Force in 1647 under the command of Captain Anthony Young for service in the Irish Sea. She helped recapture the 12-gun Hart in 1648. In 1650 she came under the command of Captain John Stoakes remaining in the Irish sea. With the end of the English civil War she was incorporated into the Commonwealth Navy. She partook in the Battle of Dungeness on 29 November 1652. In 1653 she received a new commander in Captain Edmund Seaman. On 28 February 1653 she was in the Battle of Portland followed by the Battle of the Gabbard on 2–3 June 1653 as a member of Blue Squadron, Van Division. 31 July 1653 saw her participate in the Battle of Scheveningen. She was in the River Thames during the winter of 1653/54. With the end of the First Anglo-Dutch War in 1654, she would join Robert Blake's Fleet in the Mediterranean in June 1655. In 1656 her new commander was Captain Richard Haddock, who joined Robert Blake's Fleet in the Mediterranean. In July 1656 she returned to Home Waters for service in the English Channel until 1660.

=== Service after the Restoration May 1660 ===
In 1664 she may have been under command of Captain Valentine Pyend. On 24 February 1665 she was under the command of Captain John Lloyd. She participated in the Battle of Lowestoft as a member of Blue Squadron, Van Division on 3 June 1665. Captain Daniel Henning took command on 16 November 1665. She partook in the Four Days' Battle arriving on 4 June with Prince Rupert's Squadron, Van Division. She suffered one killed and six wounded during the battle. Later in the month of June Captain Thomas Roome Coyle took command. As a member of White Squadron, Centre Division she partook in the St James Day Fight (Orfordness) on 25 July 1666. She was part of Robert Holmes Squadron during the attack on the River Vlie, also known as 'Holmes's Bonfire' on 9–10 August 1666. In 1667 the Second Anglo-Dutch War ended.

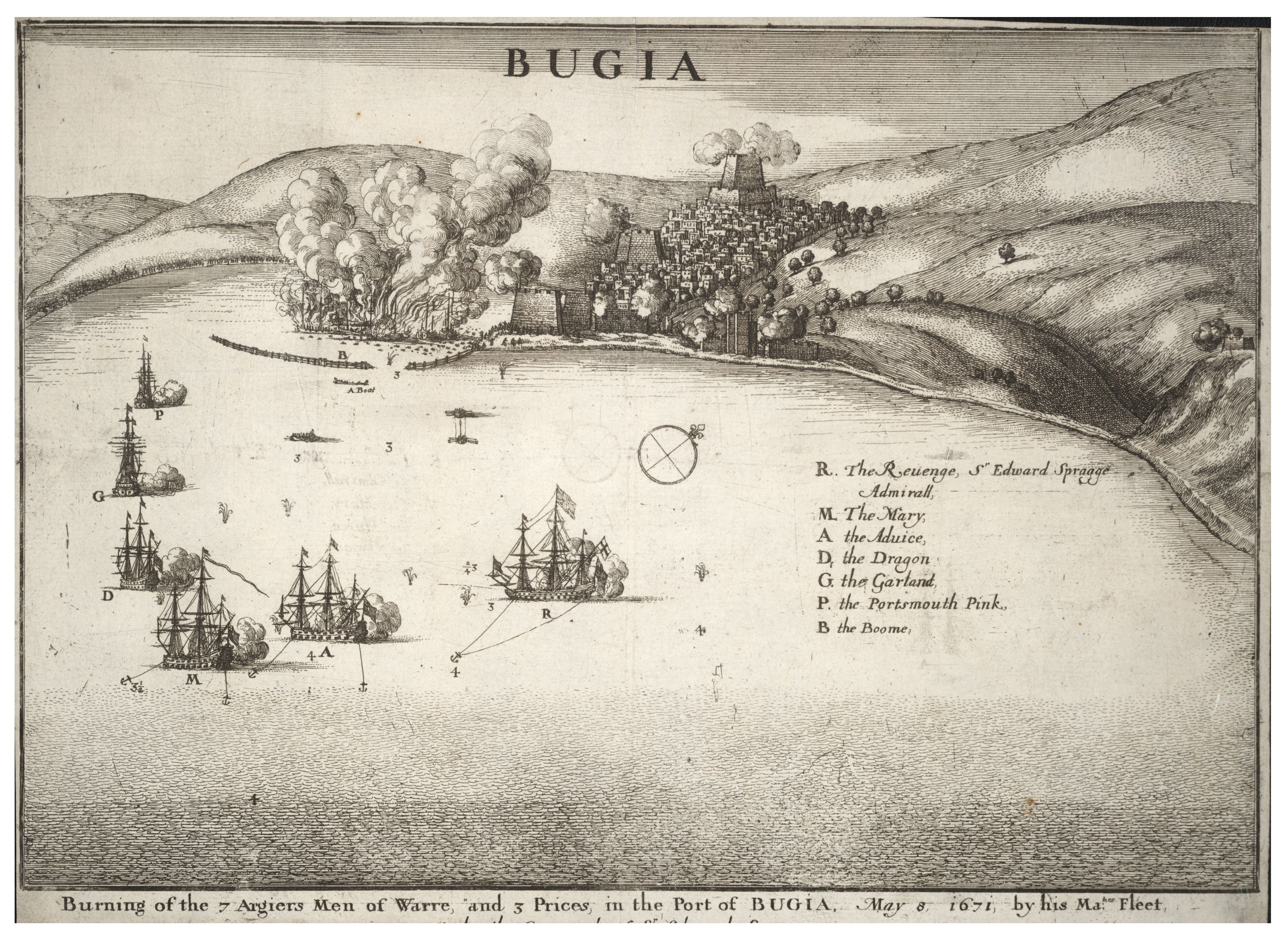
Dragon at the battle of Bugia, 8 May 1671

On 21 March 1668 she was under the command of Captain Richard May until 4 September 1668. On 6 March 1669 she was under command of Captain Arthur Herbert and sailed with Allin's Squadron to the Mediterranean. Spragge took over the squadron in 1671. She was in the Battle of Bugia on 8 May 1671. She was in action with three Algerines in May 1672. On 1 July 1672 she came under command of Captain Thomas Chamberlaine. During the Third Anglo-Dutch War, she was in action with two Dutch vessels off Bury Head. Captain David Trtter took command on 13 September 1672 for service in Home Waters, possibly in Ireland. Captain Sir Roger Strickland took command to sail with Narborough's in the Mediterranean. On 6 March 1682 Captain Thomas Hamilton took command for service in the Mediterranean. On 11 July 1686 she became the Flagship of the Mediterranean Squadron under the command of Captain Henry Killigrew. She also went to Sale, Morocco at this time. She returned to Home Waters in 1689. She was ordered on 9 May 1689 to rebuild at Deptford.

=== Rebuild at Deptford 1689 ===
She was rebuilt at Deptford under the guidance of Master Shipwright Fisher Harding. Her dimensions after rebuild were gundeck 118 feet 11 inches (36.2 metres) with 99 feet 0 inches (30.2 metres)for keel with a breadth of 31 feet 9 inches (9.7 metres) and a depth of hold of 12 feet 2 inches (3.7 metres). Her builder's measure calculated tonnage was 530 79/94 tons.

Her gun armament after a 1696 survey was 46 guns and consisted of eighteen 12-pounder guns, (Note: The 12-pounder was originally a captured Dutch gun copied for British service used in place of culverins) twenty 8-pounder guns (Note: The 8=pounder was a captured Dutch gun used in place of sakers or 6=pounders due to shortages of guns) eight sakers. (Note: The sacar or saker was a gun of 1,400 pounds with a 3.5-inch bore firing a 5.5-pound shot with a 5.5-pound powder charge) under the 1703 Establishment her armament was as 48/42 guns consisting of twenty/eighteen 12-pounder guns of 8.5 feet in length, twenty/eighteen 6-pounder guns of 8 feet in length, (Note: The 6-pounder was a captured Dutch gun adopted for British use) six/four 6-pounder guns of 7 feet in length on the quarterdeck and two 6-pounder guns of 8 feet in length on the foc's'le (Fc). Her manning was 220 personnel.

=== Service after Rebuild 1689 ===
She was commissioned in 1691 under the command of Captain William Wright for service in Ireland. She moved to the English Channel in 1692. Also in 1692 Captain William Vickars took command and sailed with Wheeler's squadron to the West Indies in early 1693. In conjunction with Russel's Fleet she helped take the French ship Diligente of Duguay-Trouin's squadron on 12 May 1694. In 1695 she was under Captain Edward Rigby sailing with Moody's Squadron to the Mediterranean escorting a convoy to Turkey. 1697 saw her with the Dunkirk Squadron. In 1701 Captain Robert Holliman took command. She sailed with Fleet. During the War of the Spanish Succession, she was in action against a French 70-gun ship on 13 October 1702 during which she suffered 26 personnel killed including Captain Holliman. Lieutenant Charles Fotherby took temporary command. In 1703 Captain Lord Henry Maynard took command for the English Channel and North Sea. She was dismantled for a rebuild at Rotherhithe in 1706/07.

=== Rebuild to 1706 Establishment at Rotherhithe ===
She was rebuilt at Cuckold's Point, Rotherhithe under the guidance of Master Shipwright James Taylor. Her dimensions after rebuild were gundeck 130 feet 11 inches (39.9 metres) with 108 feet 0 inches (32.9 metres)for keel with a breadth of 35 feet 0 inches (10.7 metres) and a depth of hold of 14 feet 0 inches (4.3 metres). Her builder's measure calculated tonnage was 719 73/94 tons.

Her gun armament under the 1703 Establishment her armament was as 48/42 guns consisting of twenty-two/twenty 18-pounders guns of 8.5 feet in length on the lower deck (LD), twenty 6-pounder guns of 8 feet in length on the upper deck (UD), four 6-pounder guns of 7 feet in length on the quarterdeck (QD) and two 6-pounder guns of 8 feet in length on the foc's'le (Fc). Her manning was 280 (wartime) and 185 (peacetime) personnel.

=== Service after 1706 rebuild ===
She was commissioned in 1707 under the command of Captain George Martin and sailed with Baker's Squadron on the Dutch coast. She went to Newfoundland in 1709. On 8 May 1710 she sailed to Nova Scotia. She was at the capture of Annapolis (Port Royal) on 2 October 1710. She returned to Home Waters at the end of 1710. She underwent a refit in 1711.

== Loss ==
Dragon was wrecked on 15 March 1712 on Les Casquets, rocks to the west of Alderney.
