= French ship Duguay-Trouin =

Twelve vessels of the French Navy have been named Duguay-Trouin in honour of René Duguay-Trouin.

== List ==
- Duguay-Trouin (1781–1793), a 74-gun ship of the line
- Duguay Trouin (1793–1794) was the East Indiaman Princess Royal that the French captured in the Indian Ocean on 27 September 1793 and took into service as an ad hoc 36-gun frigate that they named Duguay Trouin; the British recaptured her on 5 May 1794.
- Duguay-Trouin (1794–1795/6) was a tartane that the French Navy requisitioned in 1794 to serve as an aviso. The Navy renamed her Dangereuse in 1795 or 1796. The British Royal Navy captured her in 1799 and took her into service as HMS Dangereuse, but then sold her in 1801.
- Duguay-Trouin (1795–1805), a 74-gun ship of the line; the Royal Navy captured her at the Battle of Trafalgar. The British renamed her HMS Implacable, and she was the oldest ship of the line after HMS Victory when she was scuttled in 1948
- Duguay-Trouin (1813–1824), a 74-gun ship of the line
- Duguay-Trouin (1854–1872), a 90-gun ship of the line
- Duguay-Trouin (1877–1899), an iron-hulled cruiser
- Tonquin (1878–1922), a transport vessel launched in 1878, renamed Duguay-Trouin in 1900, then Borda in 1913, and converted into a hospital ship. The soldier-poet Rupert Brooke died aboard en route to the Dardanelles on 23 April 1915 at Trebuki Bay, Skyros. Renamed Moselle in 1922, and eventually scrapped in 1937
- Duguay-Trouin (1923–1952), a light cruiser, lead ship of her class, which served with the Free French Forces
- Duguay-Trouin, a Tourville-class frigate, decommissioned in 1999
- Duguay-Trouin, a Barracuda-class submarine launched in 2022

== See also ==
- Duguay-Trouin (French privateer)
