= French frigate De Grasse =

1974 French Tourville-class frigate

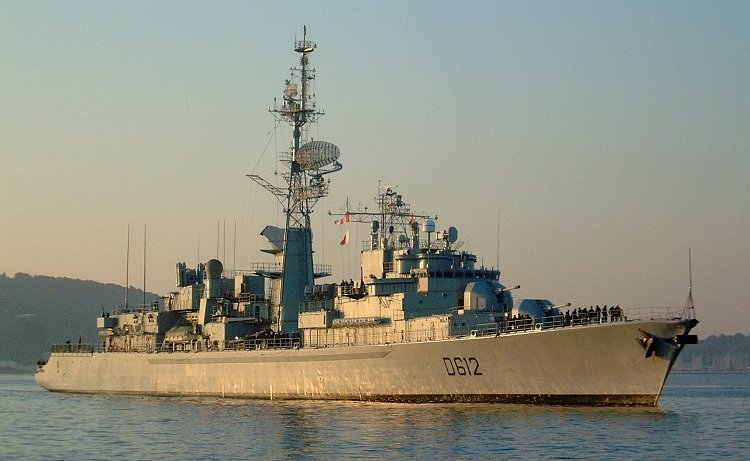

History

France
- Name: De Grasse
- Namesake: François Joseph Paul de Grasse
- Builder: Arsenal de Lorient
- Laid down: 1972
- Launched: 30 November 1974
- Commissioned: 25 October 1975
- Decommissioned: 5 May 2013
- In service: 1 October 1977
- Homeport: Brest
- Identification: D 612
- Status: Laid up

General characteristics (as built)
- Class & type: Tourville-class frigate
- Displacement: 4,580 t (4,510 long tons) (standard); 5,745 t (5,654 long tons) full load
- Length: 152.8 m (501 ft 4 in)
- Beam: 15.3 m (50 ft 2 in)
- Draught: 5.7 m (18 ft 8 in)
- Installed power: 4 × water-tube boilers; 54,400 shp (55,155 PS; 40,566 kW)
- Propulsion: 2 × shafts; 2 × steam turbines
- Speed: 32 knots (59 km/h; 37 mph)
- Range: 5,000 nautical miles (9,300 km; 5,800 mi) at 18 knots (33 km/h; 21 mph)
- Complement: 282
- Sensors & processing systems: DRBV 51B search radar; DRBV 26A early-warning radar; DRBC 32D fire-control radar; DUBV 23 hull-mounted sonar; DUBV 43 variable depth sonar
- Electronic warfare & decoys: 2 × Syllex chaff launchers
- Armament: 6 × single Exocet MM38 anti-ship missiles; 2 × single L5 torpedo launchers; 2 or 3 × single 100 mm (3.9 in) guns; 2 × single 20 mm (0.8 in) autocannon; 4 × single 12.7 mm (0.50 in) machine guns
- Aircraft carried: 2 × Westland Lynx helicopters
- Aviation facilities: Double hangar

De Grasse is one of three Tourville-class guided-missile frigates built for the French Marine Nationale during the Cold War. They were designed as convoy escorts.

== Design and description ==
The Tourville-class ships were designed as anti-submarine (ASW) escorts for convoys in the North Atlantic and are enlarged versions of the older Aconit, designed around a requirement to accommodate two Westland Lynx helicopters and Exocet anti-ship missiles. They have an overall length of 152.8 metres (501 ft 4 in), a beam of 15.3 m (50 ft 2 in) and a draught of 5.7 m (18 ft 8 in). The ships have a standard displacement of 4,580 tonnes (4,510 long tons) and 5,745 tonnes (5,654 long tons) at full load. The Tourvilles were powered by two geared steam turbines, each driving one propeller shaft using steam provided by four boilers. The turbines were rated at 54,400 shaft horsepower (55,200 PS; 40,600 kW) to give the ships a maximum speed of 32 knots (59 km/h; 37 mph) and a range of 5,000 nautical miles (9,300 km; 5,800 mi) at 18 knots (33 km/h; 21 mph). The frigate had a complement of 292 sailors including 17 officers.

The primary anti-ship weapon of the Tourvilles consisted of six single box launchers for MM38 Exocet missiles, located to the rear of the bridge with three launchers on each broadside. The frigates were designed with three 100-millimetre (3.9 in) Modèle 1968 guns in single-gun turrets; one superfiring pair forward of the bridge and the third gun positioned atop the rear superstructure. Unlike her sisters Tourville and Duguay-Trouin, De Grasse had the aft gun deleted during construction in anticipation of a Crotale anti-aircraft missile system being installed at that location. They were also equipped with two 20 mm (0.8 in) guns. The anti-submarine weapons of the Tourville-class ships included a Malafon anti-submarine missile launcher between the fore and aft superstructures for which they carried 13 missiles. They had two launchers for L5 torpedoes, one on each side of the ship. Each ship carried ten torpedoes. The Tourvilles were the first French ships of destroyer-size or larger designed to carry helicopters, a pair of Lynx ASW helicopters in a double hangar at the stern.

They were equipped with a DRBV 51B search radar, a DRBC 32D fire-control radar and a DRBV 26 early-warning radar. For anti-submarine warfare, they were equipped with DUBV 23 hull-mounted sonar and DUBV 43 towed variable depth sonar. For electronic defence, the vessels mounted two Syllex chaff launchers. The SENIT 3 tactical data system coordinated sensor data.

== Construction and career ==
De Grasse was laid down at the Arsenal de Rochefort on 14 June 1972, launched on 30 November 1974 and commissioned on 1 October 1977.

Between 1994 and 1996, De Grasse were refitted with the modern SLASM anti-submarine system, an active Very Low Frequency sonar.

== Gallery ==
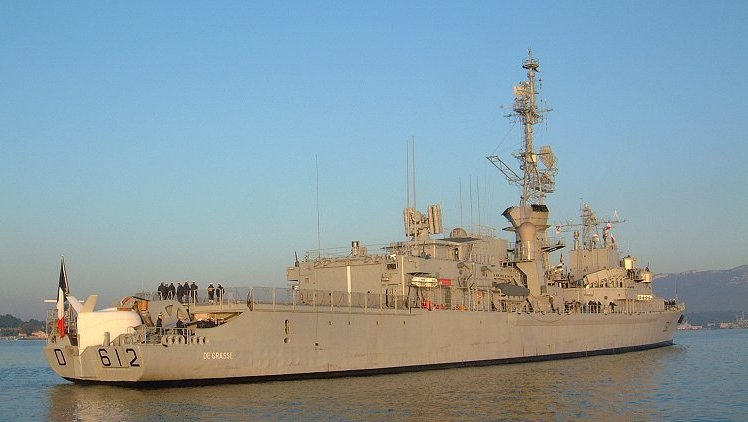
The frigate De Grasse

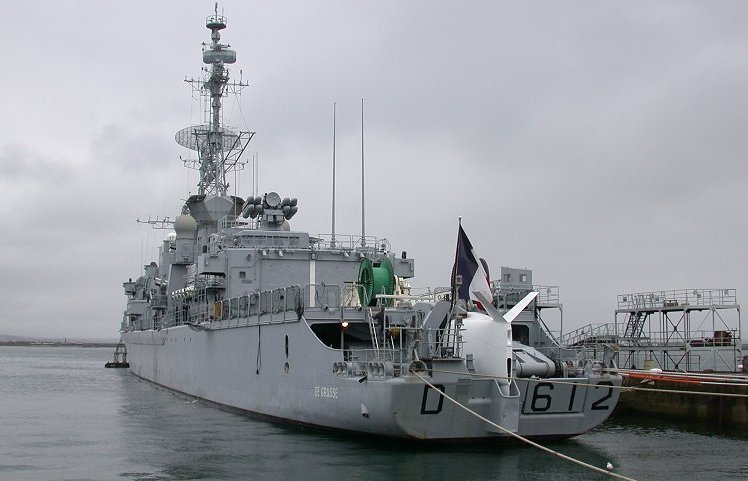
Aft of the frigate De Grasse; the towed sonar is clearly visible

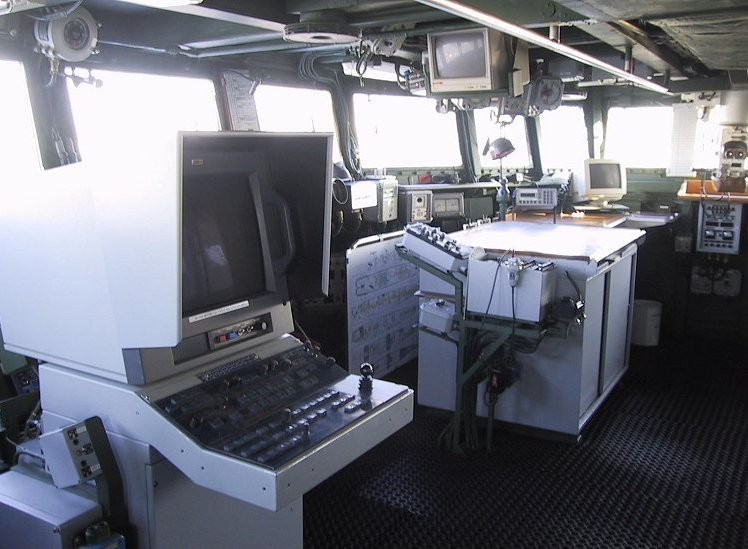
The command bridge of De Grasse

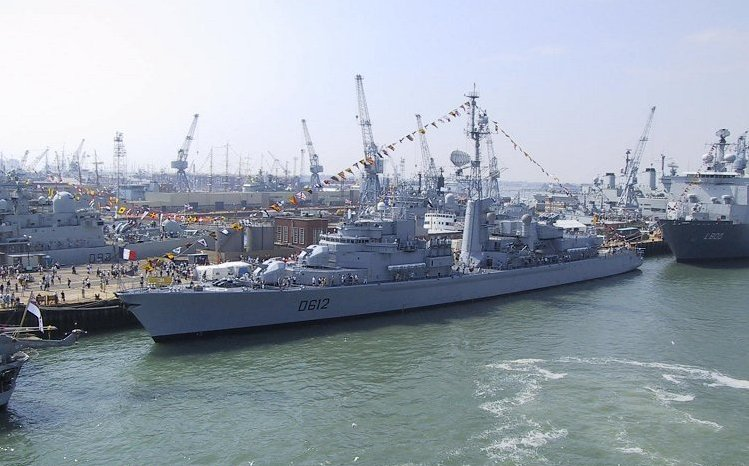
The frigate De Grasse, harboured in Portsmouth, for the International Festival of the Sea (25 August 2001).

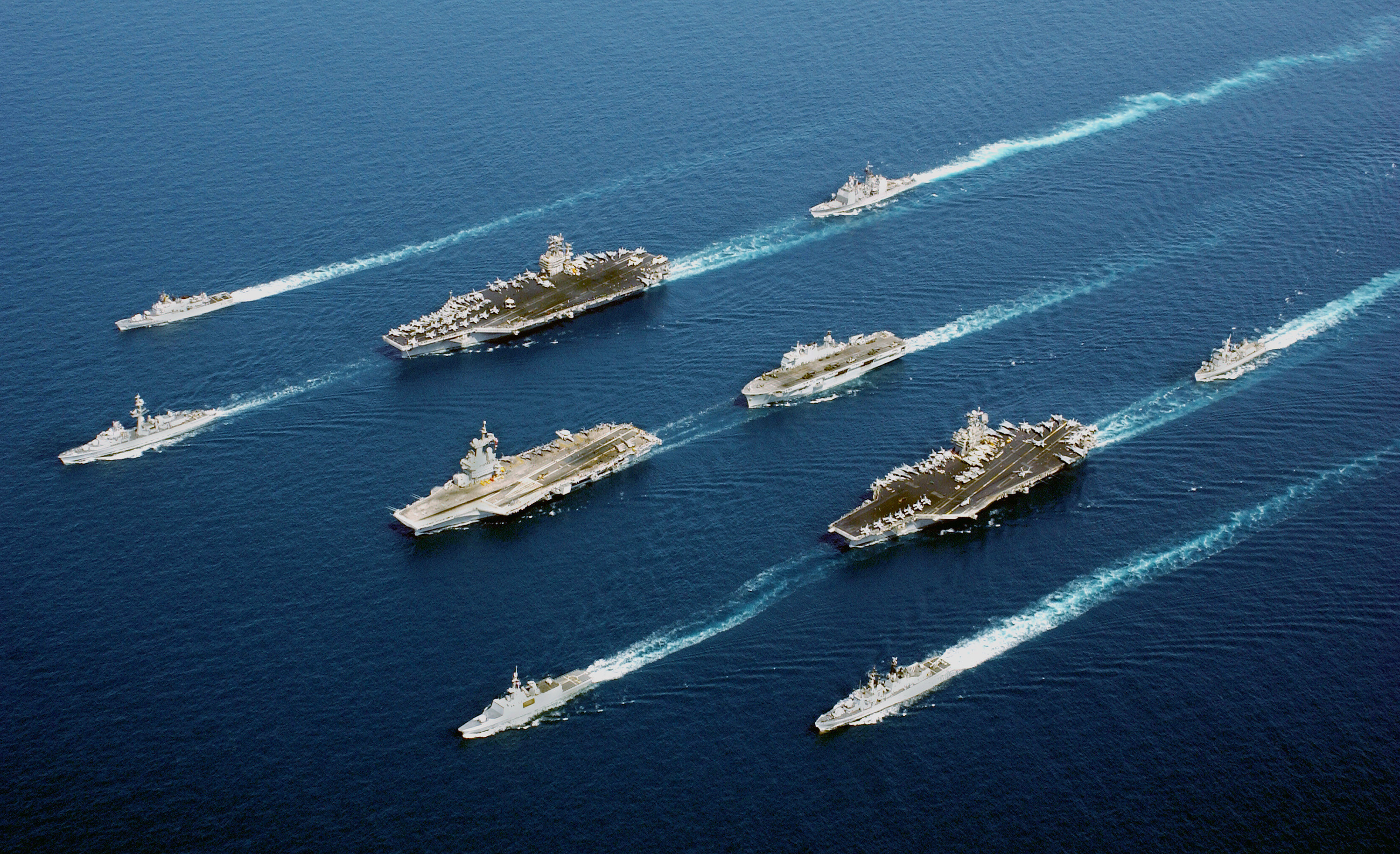
De Grasse (centre left) in a 5-country multinational fleet, during Operation Enduring Freedom in the Oman Sea.

== Bibliography ==
- Jordan, John (1995). "France". In Chumbley, Stephen (ed.). Conway's All The World's Fighting Ships 1947–1995. Annapolis, Maryland: Naval Institute Press. pp. 95–131. ISBN 1-55750-132-7.
- Moore, John, ed. (1981). Jane's Fighting Ships 1981–82. London: Jane's Publishing. ISBN 0-531-03977-3.
- Saunders, Stephen, ed. (2004). Jane's Fighting Ships 2004–2005. Coulsdon, UK: Jane's Information Group. ISBN 0-7106-2623-1.
