= Charles Jones, 5th Viscount Ranelagh =

British Royal Navy officer and Irish peer

Captain The Right Honourable The Viscount Ranelagh
- Born: 29 October 1761
- Died: 20 December 1800 (aged 39) George Street, Plymouth Dockyard
- Allegiance: United Kingdom
- Branch: Royal Navy
- Service years: –1800
- Rank: Captain
- Commands: HMS Kingfisher; HMS Echo; HMS Sibyl; HMS Minotaur; HMS Doris
- Conflicts: French Revolutionary Wars

Captain Charles Jones, 5th Viscount Ranelagh (29 October 1761 – 20 December 1800) was a British Royal Navy officer and Irish peer of the late-eighteenth century who served on the Ireland station in HMS Doris but died aged 39 from an illness during his military service.

== Naval career ==
The son of Charles Wilkinson Jones, 4th Viscount Ranelagh and his wife Sarah Montgomery (daughter of Irish politician Thomas Montgomery), Jones was raised in Dublin and attended Trinity College, Dublin before joining the Royal Navy.

Jones was appointed in 1795 to HMS Doris and attached to the Irish station during the French Revolutionary Wars. In January 1797, Doris was part of a squadron that chased the Fraternité deep into the Atlantic Ocean. Fraternité was the flagship of the French attempt to invade Bantry Bay and by driving her off, the invasion force was left leaderless and was dispersed and defeated piecemeal. Later in the year, on 20 April 1797, Jones inherited the viscountcy from his deceased father and became Lord Ranelagh.

In 1798, Doris was again involved in foiling a French attempt to invade Ireland, forming part of a squadron under Sir John Borlase Warren. Doris was detached in early October to search the Donegal coast for French ships however and so missed the Battle of Tory Island in which the French invasion force was defeated and dispersed. Two years later, Doris was in Plymouth Sound when Lord Ranelagh died from a sudden illness. His titles were passed to his younger brother Thomas Jones.

== Notes ==
Peerage of Ireland
Preceded by Charles Wilkinson Jones	Viscount Ranelagh; 1797–1800	Succeeded by Thomas Jones
