= Bernard Jauréguiberry =

French admiral and statesman

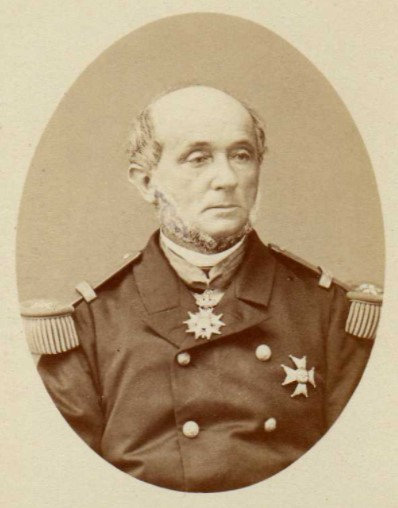

Minister of the Navy
- In office: Waddington cabinet; Freycinet cabinet

Personal details
- Born: 26 August 1815
- Died: 21 October 1887 (aged 72) Paris, France

Military service
- Branch/service: French Navy
- Rank: Rear admiral
- Battles/wars: Crimean War; Franco-Prussian War

Jean Bernard Jauréguiberry (French pronunciation: [bɛʁnaʁ ʒoʁeɡibeʁi]; 26 August 1815 – 21 October 1887) was a French admiral and statesman.

== Early life ==
A native of Bayonne, Jauréguiberry entered the French Navy in 1831. He became a lieutenant in 1845, a commander in 1856, and a captain in 1860. After serving in the Crimea and in China, and being governor of Senegal, he was promoted to rear admiral in 1869.

Jauréguiberry served in the Crimean War as commander of the gunboat Grenade, distinguishing himself at the capture of Kinburn on 17 October 1855. He was twice commended for his conduct in orders of the day.

He served on land during the second part of the Franco-Prussian War, in the rank of auxiliary general of division. He was present at the battles of Coulmiers, Villepion and Loigny-Poupry, in command of a division, and in Chanzy's retreat upon Le Mans and the battle at that place in command of a corps.

== Later naval career ==
Jauréguiberry had been amongst the most distinguished French naval officers in the military campaigns of the period. On 9 December he had been made vice admiral, and in 1871 he commanded the fleet at Toulon; in 1875 he was a member of the council of admiralty; and in October 1876 he was appointed to command the evolutionary squadron in the Mediterranean.

In February 1879 he became minister of the navy in the Waddington cabinet, and on 27 May following was elected a senator for life. He was again minister of the navy in the Freycinet cabinet in 1880. He then served as the Minister of Marine and Colonies in the Charles Duclerc government from 1882 to 1883. A fine example of the fighting French seaman of his time, Jaureguiberry died at Paris in October 1887.

== Legacy ==
Two French ships have been named in the admiral's honour, the pre-dreadnought battleship Jauréguiberry, in service from 1897 to 1919, and the fleet escort (T 53-class destroyer) Jauréguiberry, in service from 1958 to 1977.
