= French destroyer Jauréguiberry =

Destroyer of the French Navy

History

France
- Name: Jauréguiberry
- Namesake: Bernard Jauréguiberry
- Laid down: September 1954
- Launched: 5 November 1955
- Commissioned: 15 July 1958
- Decommissioned: 16 September 1977
- Stricken: 30 May 1986
- Home port: Brest
- Identification: D 637
- Fate: Sunk as the target ship Q580 for the experimentation of the Exocet missile.

General characteristics
- Class & type: T 53-class destroyer
- Displacement: 2,750 tons standard; 3,740 tons full load
- Length: 128.6 m (422 ft)
- Beam: 12.7 m (42 ft)
- Draught: 5.4 m (18 ft)
- Propulsion: 2 shaft geared turbines, 4 boilers, 63,000 hp (46,979 kW)
- Speed: 34 knots (63 km/h; 39 mph)
- Range: 5,000 nmi (9,300 km; 5,800 mi) at 18 knots (33 km/h; 21 mph)
- Complement: 347
- Armament: 6 × 127 mm guns (3 twin turrets); 6 × 57 mm guns (3 twin turrets); 4 × 20 mm guns (4 × 1); 12 × 550 mm torpedo tubes (4 × 3)

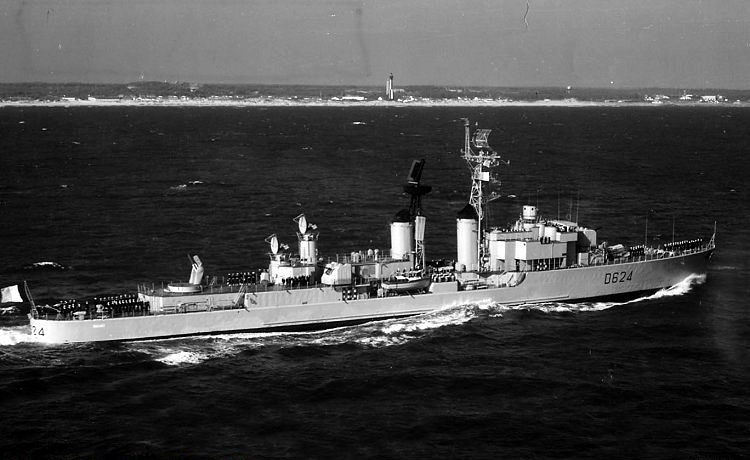
French destroyer Bouvet (D624) in 1965, scrapped in 2012 by "Vanheygen Recycling", Gent, Belgium

The fleet escort Jauréguiberry was a French destroyer of the T 53 class, designed for anti-air and (to a lesser extent) anti-submarine roles. She was the second French Navy vessel to bear the name.

Laid down in September 1954, the vessel was launched on 5 November 1955. Jauréguiberry was commissioned into the Marine Nationale on 15 July 1958 with the identification number D 637.

== Service history ==
In 1966 and 1968, she was involved in two nuclear tests with "Force Alfa", and a third one in 1970 with the cruiser De Grasse, in the Pacific Ocean. In 1974, she achieved a long mission with the frigate Duquesne.

In the beginning of 1977, a few months before being decommissioned, she was used for the film "Le Crabe-Tambour" by Pierre Schoendoerffer. The ship was decommissioned 16 September 1977, its hull receiving No. Q580. It was then used as a target ship for testing an ARMAT anti-radar missile on 16 June 1982.

It was sunk on 30 May 1986 as a target during tests to test the Exocet MM40 missile.

== Sources and references ==
- (in French) Escorteur d'Escadre Jauréguiberry, netmarine.net
