= HMS Doris (1795) =

Frigate of the Royal Navy

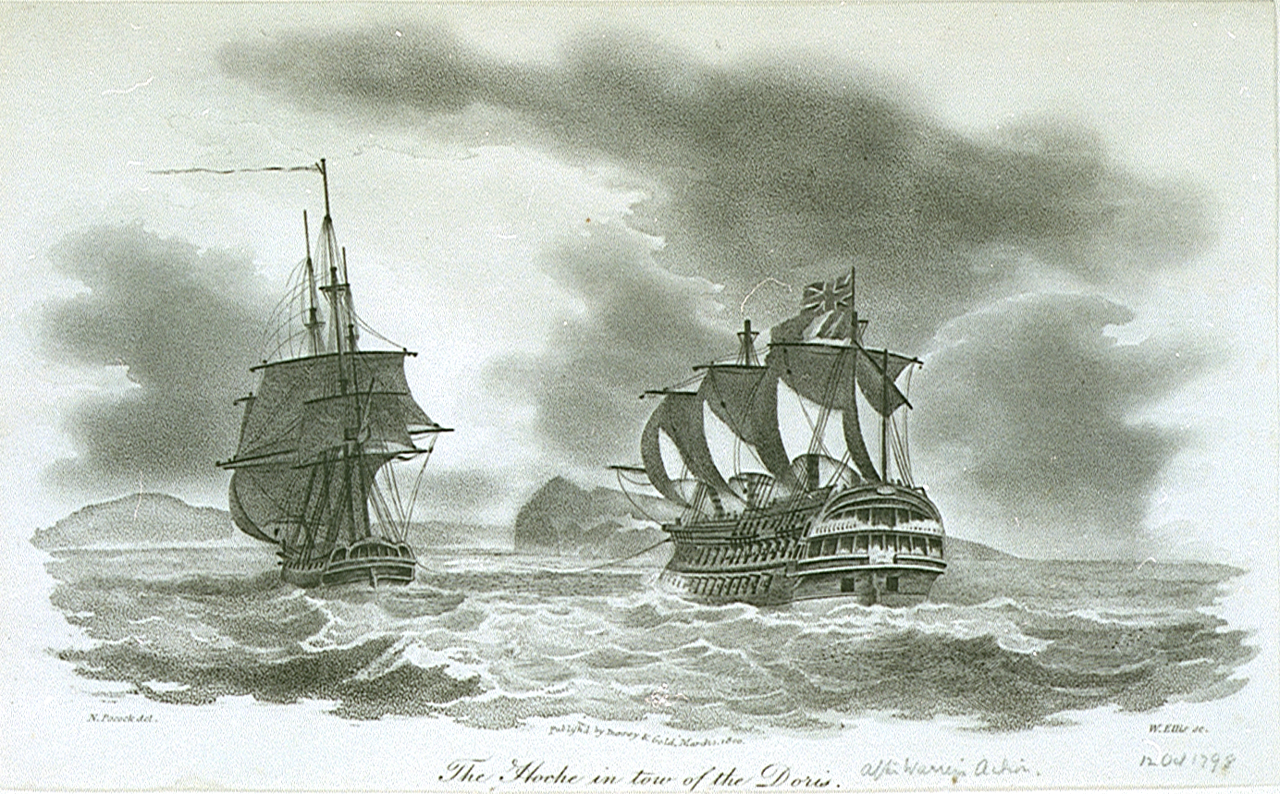
- The Hoche in tow of the Doris to Lough Swilly, County Donegal, Ireland. Hoche had been captured earlier on 12 October 1798 by Robust

History

Great Britain
- Name: HMS Doris
- Builder: Cleveley, Gravesend
- Launched: 31 August 1795
- In service: November 1795
- Fate: Sunk, 15 January 1805

General characteristics as built
- Class & type: 36-gun fifth-rate frigate
- Tons burthen: 913 (bm)
- Length: 142 ft (43.3 m) (gundeck)
- Beam: 38 ft (11.6 m)
- Propulsion: Sails
- Sail plan: Full-rigged ship
- Armament: 36 guns

HMS Doris was a 36-gun fifth-rate frigate of the Royal Navy, launched on 31 August 1795. which saw service in the French Revolutionary and Napoleonic Wars. Doris was built by Cleveley, of Gravesend.

== Service ==
She entered service in November 1795, operating as part of the Channel Fleet during the Napoleonic Wars. Her first captain was the Hon. Charles Jones, who in 1797 became Lord Ranelagh.

In June 1796, Doris and Apollo captured the French corvette Légère, of twenty-two 9-pounder guns and 168 men. Légère had left Brest on 4 June in company with three frigates. During her cruise she had captured six prizes. However, on 23 June she encountered the two British frigates at 48°30′N 8°28′W. After a 10-hour chase the British frigates finally caught up with her; a few shots were exchanged and then Légère struck. The Navy took into her service as HMS Legere.

In January 1797 Doris shared with Druid and Unicorn in the capture of the French privateer Eclair. Unicorn was the actual captor. Eclair was armed with 18 guns and had a crew of 120 men.

On 15 July, Doris took the privateer Duguay Trouin. Duguay Trouin had been armed with twenty 6-pounders and two 12-pounders but had thrown them overboard during the chase. She had a crew of 127 men and was out four days from Nantes, but had not taken any prizes. On her previous cruise she had taken the Sandwich Packet of Falmouth. Galatea shared in the capture.

On 19 July 1797, Doris and Galatea recaptured the Portuguese ship Nostra Senora de Patrocinio e Santa Anna. At some point they also recaptured the Portuguese ship Nostra Senora de Conceiçao e Navigantes.

In 1798 Doris was engaged in the hunt for Jean-Baptiste-François Bompart's French squadron that culminated in the Battle of Tory Island, although Doris was not present during the action. In 1800 and 1801, Doris under the command of John Holliday participated in the capture of six French merchant brigs and prizes.

In December 1800 Doris recaptured Countess of Bute, which the French privateer Brave had captured as Countess of Bute had been sailing from Newfoundland to Naples.

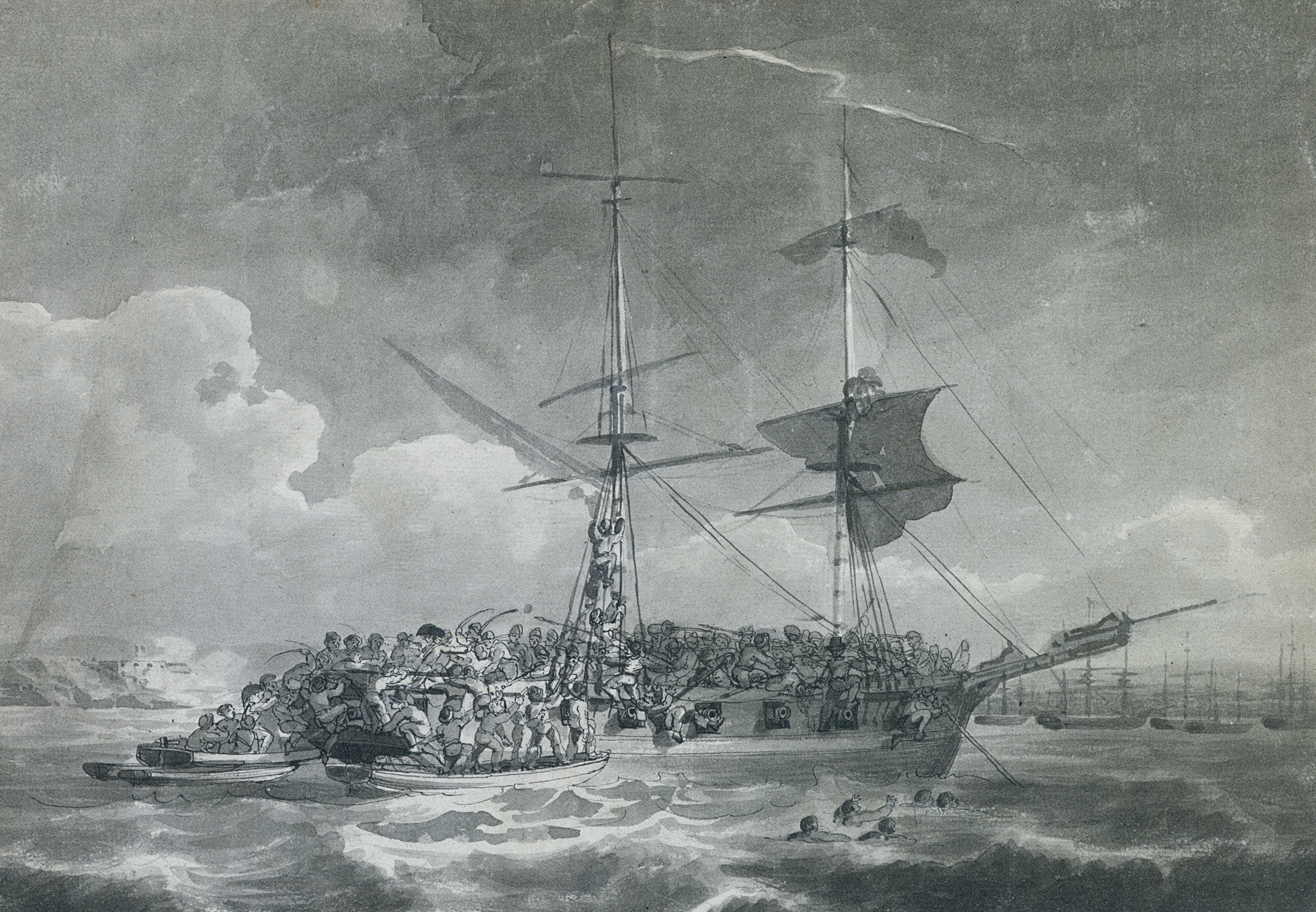
The cutting out of a French brig, possibly La Chevrette

On 21 July 1801, the boats of Doris, Beaulieu, Uranie and Robust succeeded in boarding and cutting out the French naval corvette Chevrette, which was armed with 20 guns and had 350 men on board (crew plus troops placed on board in expectation of the attack). Also, Chevrette had anchored under the batteries of Cameret Bay. The hired armed cutter Telemachus placed herself in the Goulet de Brest and thereby prevented the French from bringing reinforcements by boat to Chevrette.

The action was a sanguinary one. The British had 11 men killed, 57 wounded, and one missing. Also killed was Lieutenant Burke (who was a relative of Walter Burke- purser of HMS Victory), who was wounded in the fight, and died after boarding the French ship. Chevrette lost 92 officers and men, including her first captain, and 62 seamen and troops were wounded. In 1847 the Admiralty awarded the Naval General Service Medal with clasp "21 JULY BOAT SERVICE 1801" to surviving claimants from the action.

In 1803 following the Peace of Amiens, Doris, under the command of Captain Richard Harrison Pearson, captured the French naval lugger Affronteur, off Ushant. Affronteur was armed with fourteen 9-pounder guns and had a crew of 92 men under the command of Lieutenant de Vaisseau M. Morce André Dutoya. Capturing Affronteur required an engagement during which Doris suffered one man wounded, while Affronteur lost Dutoya and eight men killed, and 14 men wounded, one of whom died shortly thereafter. Affronteur became the hired armed vessel Caroline.

On 2 and 4 June 1803 Doris captured Prudence and Neptune. Neptune had been sailing from Marseilles to Havre when Doris captured her. Neptune's cargo consisted of soap, brimstone, liquorice, brandy, rape and sweet oil, galls, and cotton wool. (Note: Both vessels were sold at Plymouth on 30 September 1803. Prudence had a burthen of 15714/94 tons and Neptune had a burthen of 12331/94 tons.)

== Fate ==
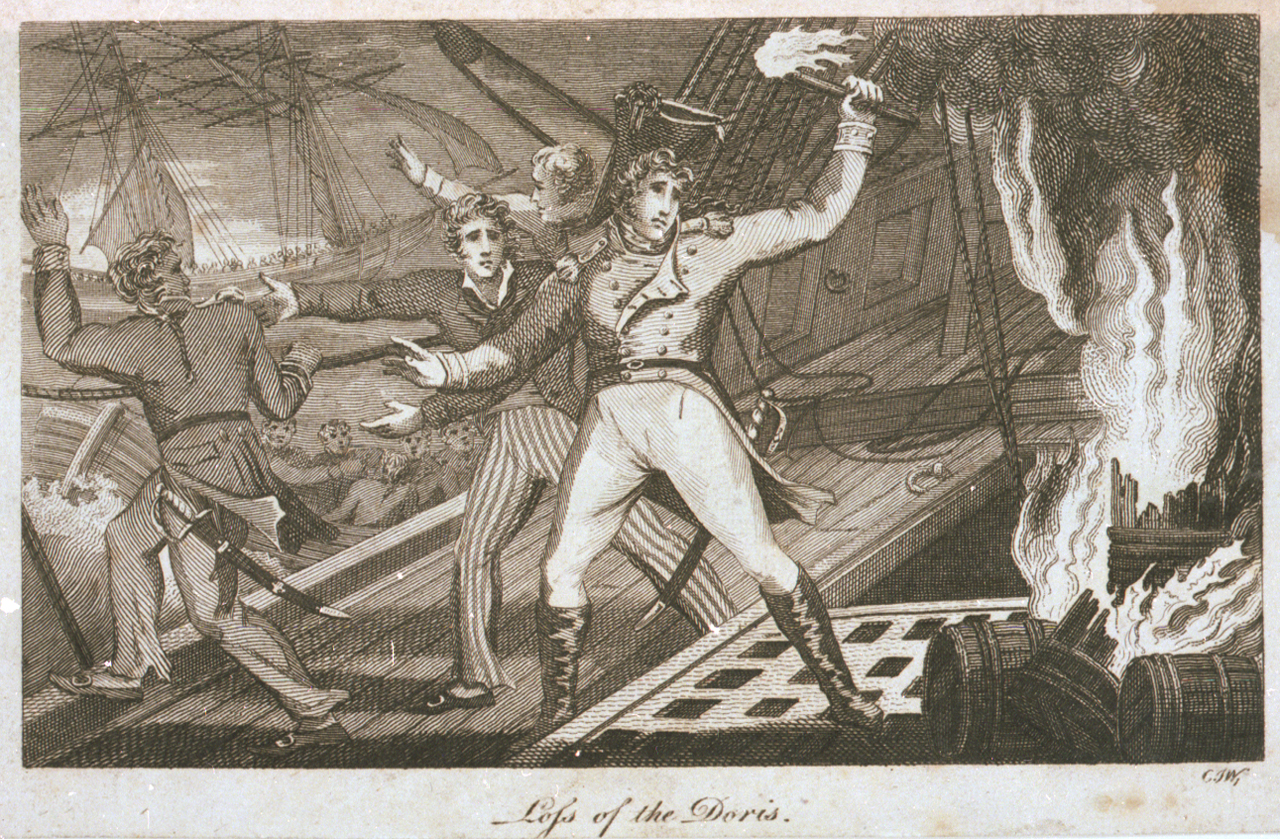
Captain Patrick Campbell setting the Doris alight in January 1805 to avoid capture.

In 1805, while under the command of Captain Patrick Campbell, Doris was lost on a rock off Quiberon Bay. She had arrived there on 11 January to bring news of a French squadron that was preparing to set sail, but when she arrived the British fleet was no longer in the bay. On the morning of the 12th, as Doris set sail, the weather worsened. Campbell returned to the bay to take shelter, at which time Doris hit the Diamond Rock in Benequet Passage. She took on water but the crew was able to get her nearly clear of water, in part by stretching a sail over the hole in her side and then pumping the accumulated water out. However, that afternoon the schooner Felix arrived with news that the Rochefort Squadron had sailed. Campbell felt it imperative that he get the news to the blockading squadron. As he set sail, it now being 15 January, the holes in the hull opened and despite her crew's efforts to save her she began to sink rapidly. Campbell anchored her eight miles north-east of Le Croisic and evacuated the crew to Felix and a passing American merchant schooner. He then set the ship on fire to prevent her use by the enemy. He later took passage to Britain aboard HMS Tonnant. The subsequent court martial reprimanded the pilot, Jean Le Gall, for his lack of skill.
