= Antoine Graincourt =

French painter

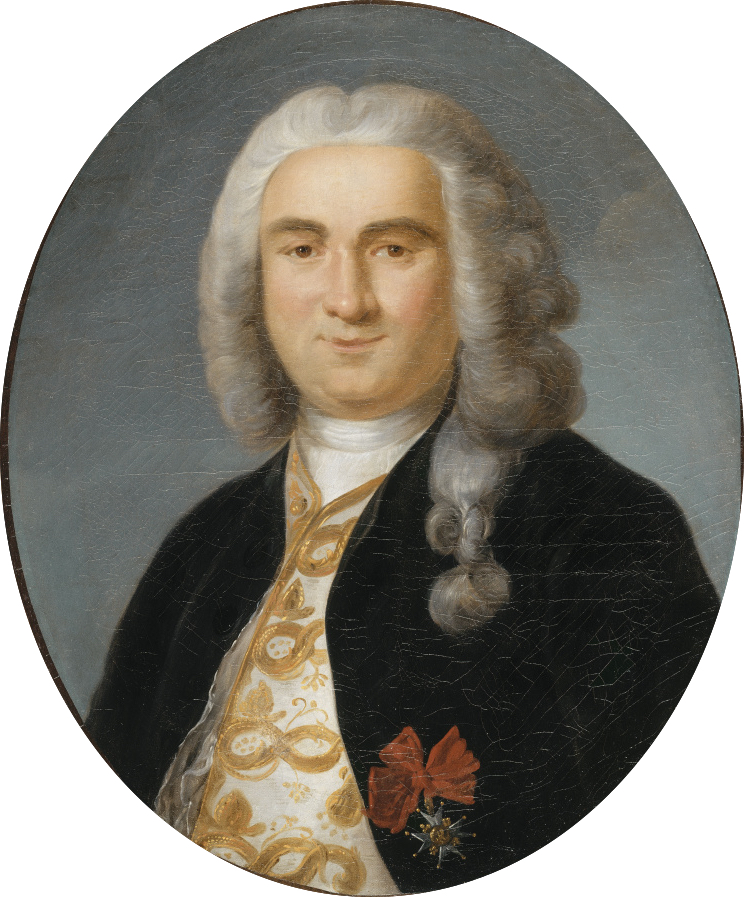
Portrait of Bertrand-François Mahé de La Bourdonnais by Graincourt

Antoine Noël Benoît Graincourt (17 March 1748 – 26 December 1823) was a French painter who specialised in portrait miniatures. He was born in Corbie, Picardy in the Somme Valley on 17 March 1748 but moved away from his home region to Paris, where he trained under Gabriel François and Pierre Doyen and received a stipend from the Cardinal of Luynes. He painted portraits of famous French military and naval figures both contemporary and from the recent past, including René Duguay-Trouin and François Louis de Rousselet, Marquis de Châteaurenault. He died in Champeaux on 26 December 1823.
