= French ship Diligente =

Sixteen ships of the French Navy have borne the name Diligente ("Diligent"):

== Ships named Diligente ==
- Diligente (1667), a 14-gun frigate
- Diligente (1676), a light frigate
- Diligente (1691), a 20-gun frigate
- Diligente (1705), a 6-gun corvette
- Diligente (1720), a fluyt
- Diligente (1738), a 4-gun tartane
- Diligente (1746), a sloop
- Diligente (1756), a 10-gun corvette
- Diligente (1761), a 32-gun frigate
- Diligente (1794), a Naïade-class brig
- Diligente (1801), a corvette, lead ship of her class
- Diligente (1810), a gunboat
- Diligente (1810), a corvette
- Diligente (1838), a sloop
- Diligente (1864), a gunboat, lead ship of her class
- Diligente (1916), a Friponne-class minesweeper

== See also ==
- French ship Diligent
- HMS Diligent

== Notes and references ==
Notes

Bibliography

- Roche, Jean-Michel (2005a). Dictionnaire des bâtiments de la flotte de guerre française de Colbert à nos jours. Vol. 1. Group Retozel-Maury Millau. ISBN 978-2-9525917-0-6. OCLC 165892922.
- Roche, Jean-Michel (2005b). Dictionnaire des bâtiments de la flotte de guerre française de Colbert à nos jours. Vol. 2. Group Retozel-Maury Millau. ISBN 978-2-9525917-0-6. OCLC 165892922.
