= Duguay-Trouin (French privateer) =

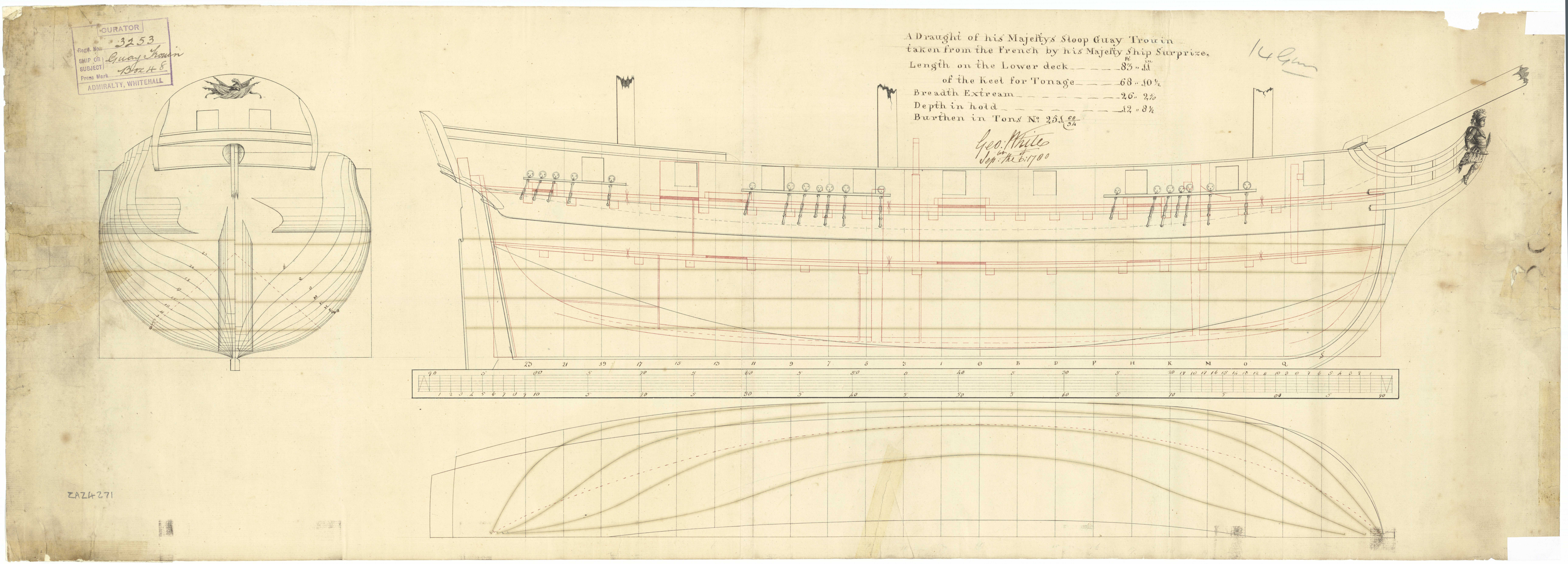
Guay Trouin of 1780, (alternative spelling DuGuay Trouin)

During the late 18th and early 19th centuries, many French privateers and letters of marque bore the name Duguay-Trouin, named for René Duguay-Trouin: René Trouin, Sieur du Gué (10 June 1673 – 1736), French privateer, admiral and Commander in the Order of Saint Louis. Between 1760 and 1810, warships of the Royal Navy captured seven different French privateers all with the name Duguay-Trouin.

In British records the name is sometimes given as Du Guay Trouin, Dugai Trouin, Drigai Trouin, or Guay Trouin.

- Du Guay Trouin, a privateer that Tweed captured on 30 December 1760.
- HMS Duguay-Trouin was a 150-tonne French privateer sloop of 168 men and 18 to 20 guns, under Pierre-Denis Ducassou, that Surprise captured in on 29 January 1780 and brought to Plymouth where the British Royal Navy took her into service. The Navy sold Duguay-Trouin on 30 October 1783. She then became the mercantile West Indiaman and slaver Christopher, and was lost in 1804.

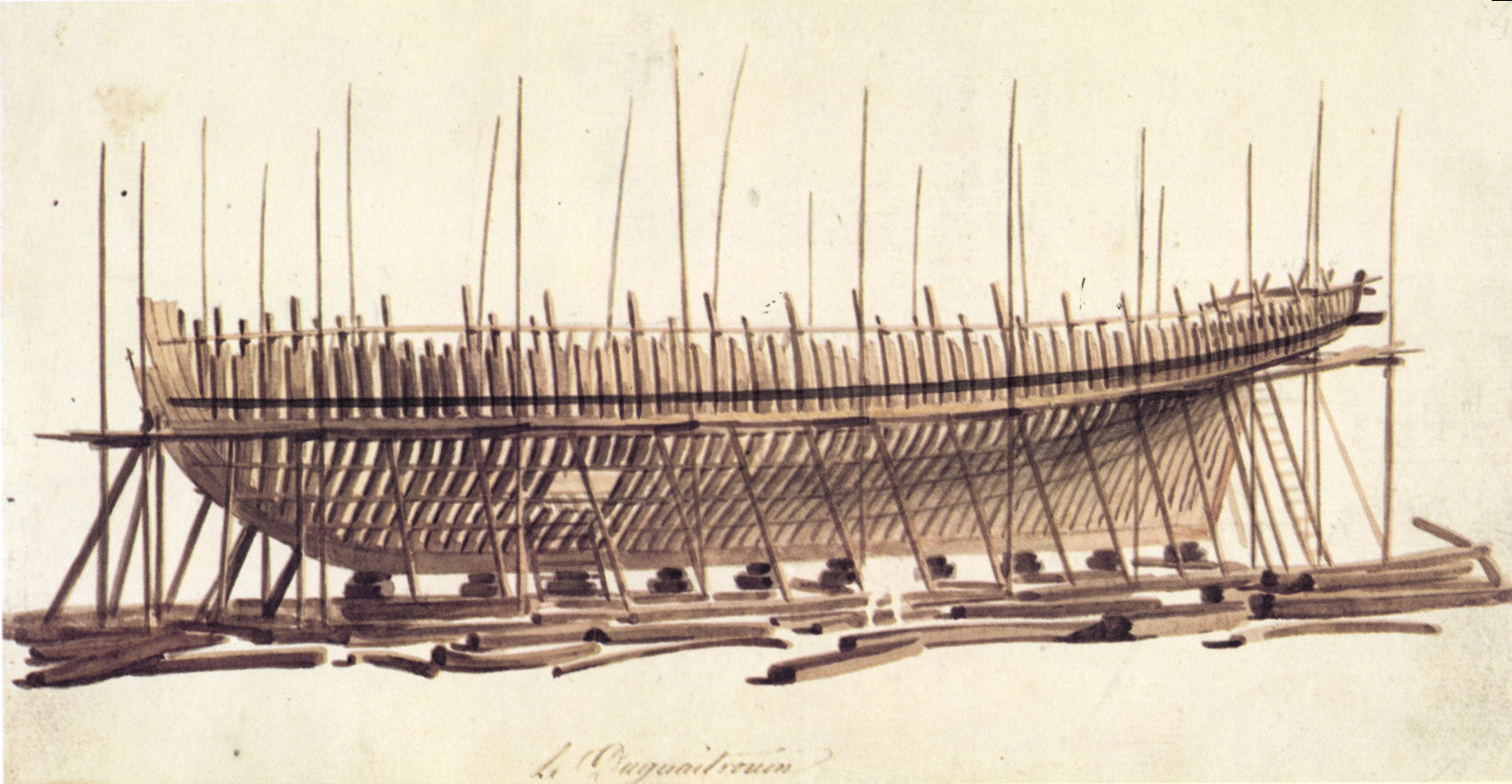
Duguay-Trouin (1793), from Marseille.

- Privateer Duguay-Trouin (1793), a privateer from Marseille, that Antoine Roux depicted under construction.
- Privateer Duguay-Trouin (1793—1794), the British 805-tonne East Indiaman Princess Royal, commissioned in 1786 and captured in the Sunda Strait on 27 September 1793 by three French privateers. She was recommissioned as a privateer frigate at Isle de France in December 1793, under Julien Tréhouart des Chesnais, with 403 men and 34 guns (twenty-six 12-pounder, two 9-pounder, and six 4-pounder guns). A British squadron comprising HMS Centurion, Resistance, and Orpheus engaged her; Duguay-Trouin sustained 21 killed and 60 wounded before she surrendered.
- Privateer Duguay-Trouin of 22 guns that Doris captured on 15 July 1797.
- Privateer Duguay-Trouin that Shannon captured on 2 February 1798. She had been built in 1782 and was the former merchantman and slave trader Baron de Binder (Baron Bender). In 1793 made a cruise as a privateer and then the French Navy requisitioned her as a corvette. In May 1795 it renamed her Calypso. After about three years the Navy returned her to her owners. She cruised again as the privateer Duguay-Troiun until her capture.
- Privateer Duguay-Trouin (1796—1797), a 250-ton privateer brig from Nantes of 100 to 127 men and 22 guns (20 6-pounders and 2 12-pounder carronades). She did a cruise under Ensign Pierre-Fabien Lejeune from late 1796 to early 1797, and two under Jean Dutache between March 1797 and July 1797. The 36-gun frigate HMS Doris captured her on 27 July 1797.
- Privateer Duguay-Trouin (1798), a privateer from Bordeaux, under Destebetcho. Possibly captured by the 36-gun frigate HMS Doris on 8 July 1798.
- Privateer Duguay-Trouin (1804), a three-masted ship from Saint-Malo, commissioned in April 1804, ferrying 160 soldiers to Martinique under Henri-Pierre-Michel Lemaître, of 99 men and 16 guns. Wrecked near Audierne on 30 June 1804.
- Privateer Du Guay Trouin, commissioned in Brest in June 1804, of 10 guns and 116 men, that HMS Unite captured on 19 May 1810.
- HMS Duguay-Trouin. This Duguay Trouin may have been the schooner that Ferret and Hussar captured on 30 March 1809. This letter of marque was commissioned in April to carry eight guns. She then served in Sir John Borlase Warren's squadron.
- Privateer Duguay-Trouin of 14 guns that Narcissus captured on 19 January 1810. She was out of Brest and had a burthen of 163 tons, or 19339/94, a length of 85 ft 5 in (26.0 m) and beam of 23 ft 7 in (7.2 m).
