= Bertrand-François Mahé de La Bourdonnais =

French Navy officer and colonial administrator

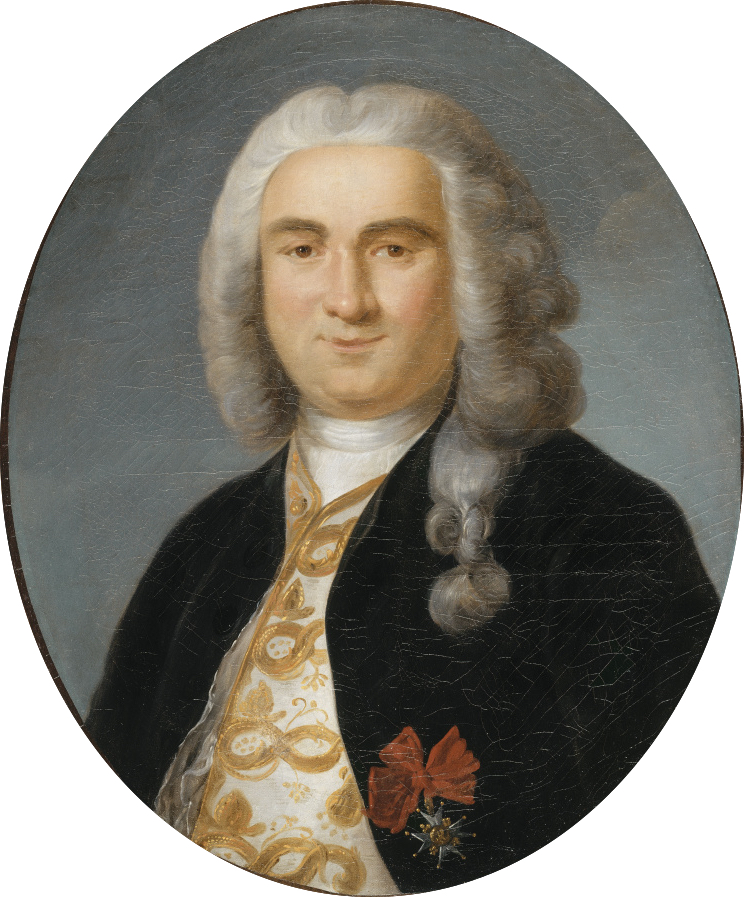
- Portrait by Antoine Graincourt

Governor of Réunion
- In office 1735

Personal details
- Born: 11 February 1699
- Died: 10 November 1753 (aged 54)

Military service
- Branch/service: French Navy
- Rank: Captain

Bertrand-François Mahé, comte de La Bourdonnais (11 February 1699 – 10 November 1753) was a French Navy officer and colonial administrator who was employed by the French Indies Company.

== Biography ==
La Bourdonnais entered the service of the French Indies Company as a lieutenant. In 1724, he was promoted to captain, and he displayed such bravery in the capture of Mahé on the Malabar Coast that the name of the town was supposedly added to his own as a result of this; however, an alternative account suggests that the town adopted his name, rather than the other way around. For two years, he was in the service of the Portuguese Viceroy, but in 1735 he returned to French service as governor of the Isle de France (present-day Mauritius) and the Île de Bourbon (present-day Réunion). His first five years' administration of the islands was vigorous and successful. He significantly increased the enslaved African population in Isle de France (Mauritius), which grew from only 638 in 1735 by around 1,300 annually. Labourdonnais also brought 70 slaves for his own estate.

A visit to France in 1740 was interrupted by the outbreak of hostilities with Great Britain, and La Bourdonnais was put at the head of a fleet in Indian waters. In 1744, he assembled a squadron of 3,342 men, including 720 slaves, and led a military expedition from Isle de France to Madras in India. His victory increased the rivalry with Governor of Pondicherry, Joseph François Dupleix. Soon Labourdonnais was accused of receiving money from the British East India Company and in 1746 he was forced to return to France to face trial and was jailed at the Bastille for 3 years. He was replaced by Pierre Félix Barthelemy David, the son of a director of the French East India Company. He was tried in 1751 and acquitted, but his health was broken by the imprisonment and by chagrin at the loss of his property. To the last he made accusations against Dupleix.

== Recognition and legacy ==
In 1742, his name was given to the main island (Mahé Island) of the Seychelles archipelago by French explorer Lazare Picault. In 1806 the French General Decaen founded and named the historic port village of Mahébourg in homage to Mahé de La Bourdonnais. Close to the village of Mapou, in Rivière du Rempart District, there is an estate named Domaine de Labourdonnais with its manor house known as Le Château de Labourdonnais, built in 1856, and now converted into a museum. A statue of La Bourdonnais was erected at Place D'Armes in Port Louis on 30 August 1859 during a ceremony. In Curepipe a school called Lycée La Bourdonnais was founded in 1953, where the curriculum is modelled on practices in France. There is another statue of La Bourdonnais in the port of Saint-Malo, France. In Saint-Denis, Réunion a statue of La Bourdonnais was also erected, and a suburb is named Cité Labourdonnais. However the statue and suburb in Reunion island have been the target of anti-slavery protesters since 2020. A street in the French quarter of Puducherry bears his name.

== Family ==
In March and April 1738, two of Labourdonnais' children died, and in May 1738 his wife also died on Isle de France (Mauritius). His daughter Montlezun Pardiac continued to live on Isle de France (Mauritius) and received an annual pension of 3,000 Louis following a vote in the National Assembly in August 1798. His grandson was the strong chess player Louis-Charles Mahé de La Bourdonnais. In December 1827, a lead-lined coffin containing the remains of Labourdonnais' wife and child was discovered during repairs of a government building near the Jardin de la Compagnie.

His sole surviving male descendant presently lives in Canada.
