= French ship Diligent =

At least two ships of the French Navy have been named Diligent:

- French ship Diligent (1762), launched in 1762 and broken up in 1780.
- French corvette Diligent (1781), launched in 1775 as Tannah she was captured by France in 1781 and sank in 1782.
