= French frigate Aconit (F65) =

French frigate

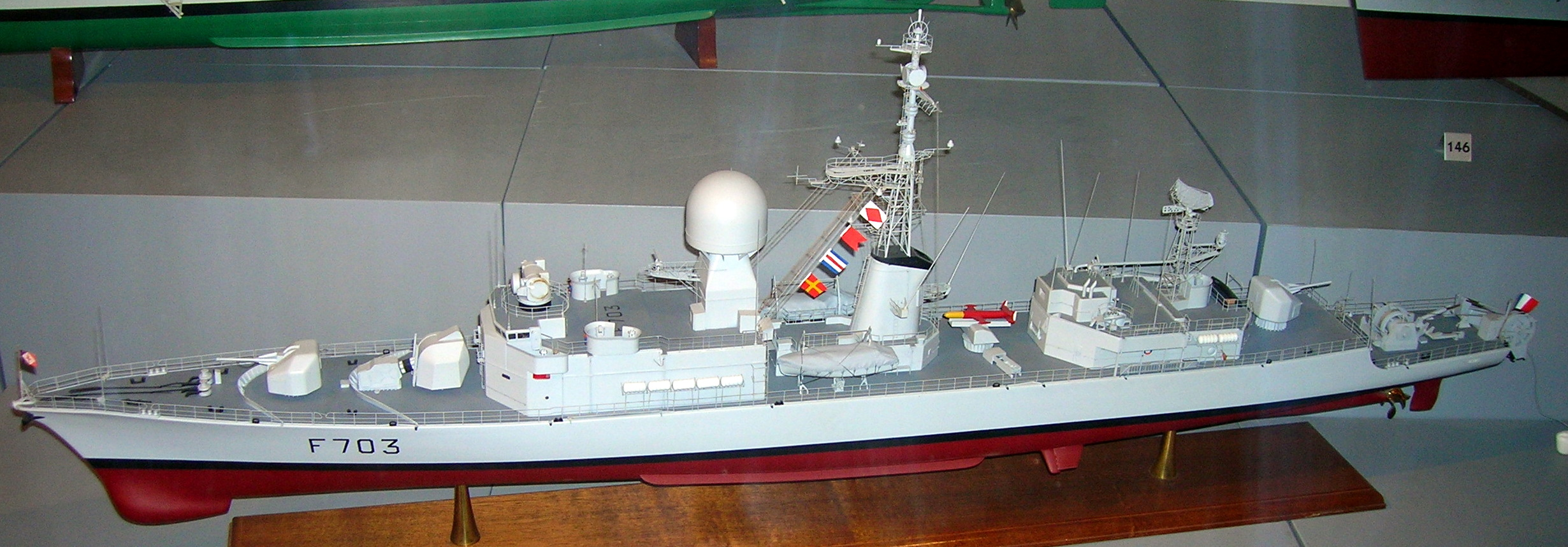
- Model of Aconit (Musée national de la Marine)

Class overview
- Name: Type C65 corvette (1968–1988); Type F65 frigate (1988–1997)
- Operators: French Navy
- Preceded by: T 53 class
- Succeeded by: Tourville class
- Built: 1968–1973
- In commission: 1973–1997
- Planned: 5
- Completed: 1
- Cancelled: 4
- Retired: 1

History

France
- Name: Aconit
- Builder: Arsenal de Lorient
- Laid down: 22 March 1968
- Launched: 7 March 1970
- Commissioned: 30 March 1973
- Decommissioned: 27 February 1997
- Identification: F 703; D 609
- Fate: Demolished 24 November 2018

General characteristics
- Type: Frigate
- Displacement: 3,135 tonnes (3,085 long tons) standard; 3,870 tonnes (3,809 long tons) full load
- Length: 127 m (417 ft) o/a
- Beam: 13.4 m (44 ft 0 in)
- Draught: 5.8 m (19 ft 0 in)
- Propulsion: 1 × Rateau steam turbine, 28,650 hp (21,364 kW), single shaft
- Speed: 27 knots (50 km/h; 31 mph)
- Range: 1,600 nmi (3,000 km; 1,800 mi) at 27 knots (50 km/h; 31 mph); 5,000 nmi (9,300 km; 5,800 mi) at 18 knots (33 km/h; 21 mph)
- Complement: 232
- Sensors & processing systems: As built: DRBV22A air surveillance radar; DRBV-13 surveillance radar; Decca 1226 navigation radar; DRBC32B fire control radar; DUBV23 active sonar (bow); DUBV43 towed active sonar; From 1985: DRBV-15A surveillance radar (replaced DRBV-13); From 1992: DRBN34A navigation radar (replaced Decca 1226); DRBC-32D radar (replaced DRBC-32B); DSBV62C towed passive sonar added
- Electronic warfare & decoys: As built: 1 × SLQ25 Nixie towed decoy; From 1970s: ARBR16 radar detector; 2 × Syllex decoy launchers
- Armament: As built: 2 × Model 1968 100 mm (4 in) gun turrets; 1 × Malafon missile launcher; 2 × launchers for L5 torpedoes (10 carried); 1 × quadruple 305 mm (12 in) anti-submarine mortar; From 1985: 8 × Exocet MM40 missiles (replaced anti-submarine mortar); From 1992: Addition of; 2 × Oerlikon 20 mm cannons; 2 × 12.7 mm (0.50 in) machine guns

Aconit was a unique frigate built for the French Navy during the Cold War, in commission from 1973 until 1997. She was named after the corvette Aconit which fought in the Free French Naval Forces during World War II.

== Development and design ==
The Type C65 corvette was built to counter the improved performance of submarines in the 1960s, and was designed around two recently developed systems: the DUBV43 towed active sonar, and the Malafon anti-submarine missile. Although considered to be the ultimate evolution of the T 47 class, performance did not live up to expectations, and the development of the propulsion system took much longer than expected. The lack of facilities for landing helicopters was considered a significant drawback, and she was the last major warship built in France without them. Eventually the C65 programme, in which five ships were planned, was cancelled.

== Service history ==
Aconit was laid down at the Arsenal de Lorient on 22 March 1968, launched on 7 March 1970 and commissioned on 30 March 1973. She was initially based at Toulon before transferring to Brest in 1975, having changed her pennant number from F703 to D609 on 1 January 1974.

The ship received several upgrades during her lifetime. In the 1970s she was fitted with the ARBR-16 radar detector and two Syllex chaff launchers. In 1984–85 she underwent a Indisponibilité pour Entretien et Réparations ("Unavailability for Maintenance and Repairs") during which the 305 mm anti-submarine mortar was replaced by eight Exocet MM40 missiles, and the DRBV-13 radar in the radome upgraded to the DRBV-15A.

In 1988 she was re-designated a Type F65 frigate.

Another IPER in 1992 added the DSBV62C towed passive sonar, two Oerlikon 20 mm cannon, two 12.7 mm machine guns, and the Inmarsat and Syracuse satellite telecommunications systems. In addition, the Decca 1226 navigation radar was replaced with the DRBN34A, and the DRBC-32B radar was upgraded to the DRBC-32D.

Scheduled to be in service until 2004, she was decommissioned on 27 February 1997 as part of a Fleet Reduction Programme. As of 2010 she was laid up at the French Navy "graveyard" at Lanvéoc awaiting demolition.
