= René Duguay-Trouin =

French Navy officer and privateer (1673–1736)

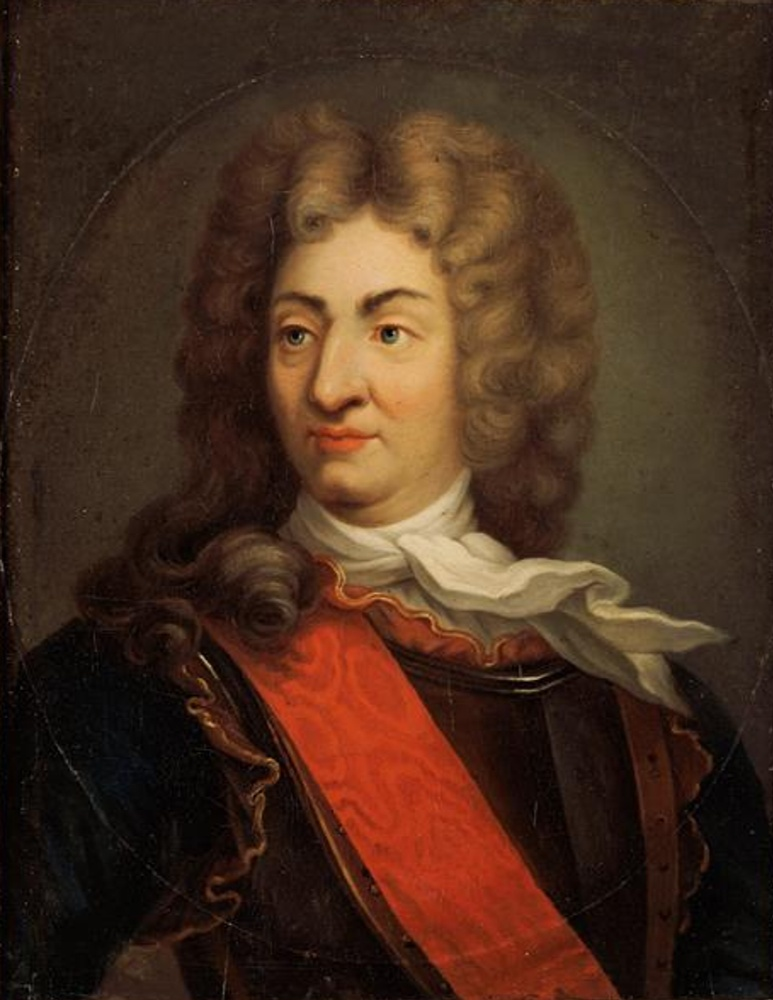
- Portrait by Antoine Graincourt
- Born: 10 June 1673; Saint-Malo, Brittany
- Died: 27 September 1736 (aged 63); Paris, France
- Military career
- Allegiance: France
- Branch: French Navy
- Service years: 1690–1736
- Rank: Lieutenant général des armées navales
- Commands: Danycan, Hermine, Diligente, Bellone, Railleuse
- Conflicts: War of the Spanish Succession; • Battle at The Lizard; • Battle of Rio de Janeiro

Lieutenant général des armées navales René Trouin, Sieur du Gué, also known as René Duguay-Trouin (French pronunciation: [ʁəne dyɡɛ tʁuɛ̃]; 10 June 1673 – 27 September 1736), was a French Navy officer and privateer best known for his service in the War of the Spanish Succession. Successful in his military career, Duguay-Trouin eventually becoming Lieutenant-General of the Naval Armies of the King (vice admiral; French: Lieutenant-Général des armées navales du roi) in 1728, as well as a Commander in the Order of Saint-Louis. Ten ships of the French navy have since been named in his honour.

== Early life ==
Duguay-Trouin was born in Saint-Malo, Brittany on 10 June 1673. His family were ship-owners, operating a shipping business out of Saint-Malo, a port favoured by French corsairs. At the age of 16, Duguay-Trouin first went to sea as a sailor on board the French privateer Trinité under the command of a Captain Legoux. The privateer subsequently captured two enemy merchant ships, the François Samuel and Seven Stars of Scotland. Just two years later in 1691, his family provided him with command of his own ship, the 14-gun lugger Danycarn. In the next year, King Louis XIV appointed Duguay-Trouin to command the thirty-gun ship of the line Hercule on 6 June.

== Ennoblement and naval career ==
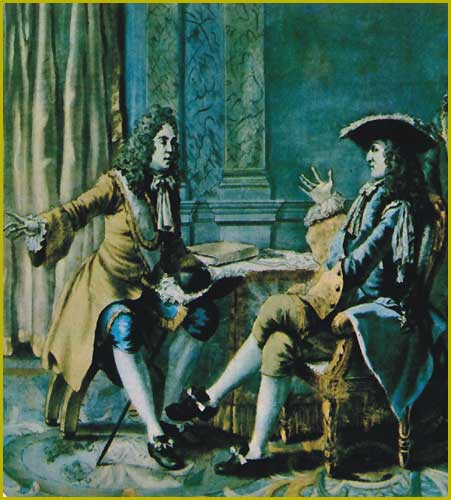
An illustration of Réné Duguay-Trouin telling King Louis XIV of his exploits.

In 1694, Louis XIV awarded Duguay-Trouin with a sword of honour for his naval service. In the same year, Duguay-Trouin, commanding the frigate Diligente, was attacked by a Royal Navy squadron commanded by Admiral David Mitchell while convoying a group of French merchant ships on 12 April. Duguay-Trouin successfully enabled the convoy to escape capture but was forced by Mitchell's squadron to strike his colours after a brief naval engagement which saw most of the crew of Diligente either killed or wounded. Duguay-Truin was taken as a prisoner of war to Plymouth, England.

The Admiralty, upon learning that Duguay-Trouin had fired upon Prince of Orange, an English merchant ship, while flying the Red Ensign, imprisoned him. On 19 June, Duguay-Trouin successfully escaped from England by boarding a small ship that he purchased from a friendly Swedish sea captain whose vessel was lying at anchor nearby. During his escape attempt, he was accompanied by four crewmembers: Lieutenant Nicolas Thomas, naval surgeon L'Hermite, Pierre Legendre and the quartermaster of Diligente. After conducting a series of raids on coastal settlements in Ireland, Duguay-Truin returned to Saint-Malo.

In 1697, the Treaty of Ryswick concluded the Nine Years' War, bringing a halt to the activities of naval officers such as Duguay-Trouin; he temporarily settled down in Saint-Malo. During this period, he was involved in a duel with another gentleman, Charles Cognetz, who Duguay-Trouin alleged had cheated in a game of cards. Both men were subsequently detained and taken to a local police official, Monsieur de Vauborel, who explicitly forbade the two to engage in any further violence.

=== War of the Spanish Succession ===
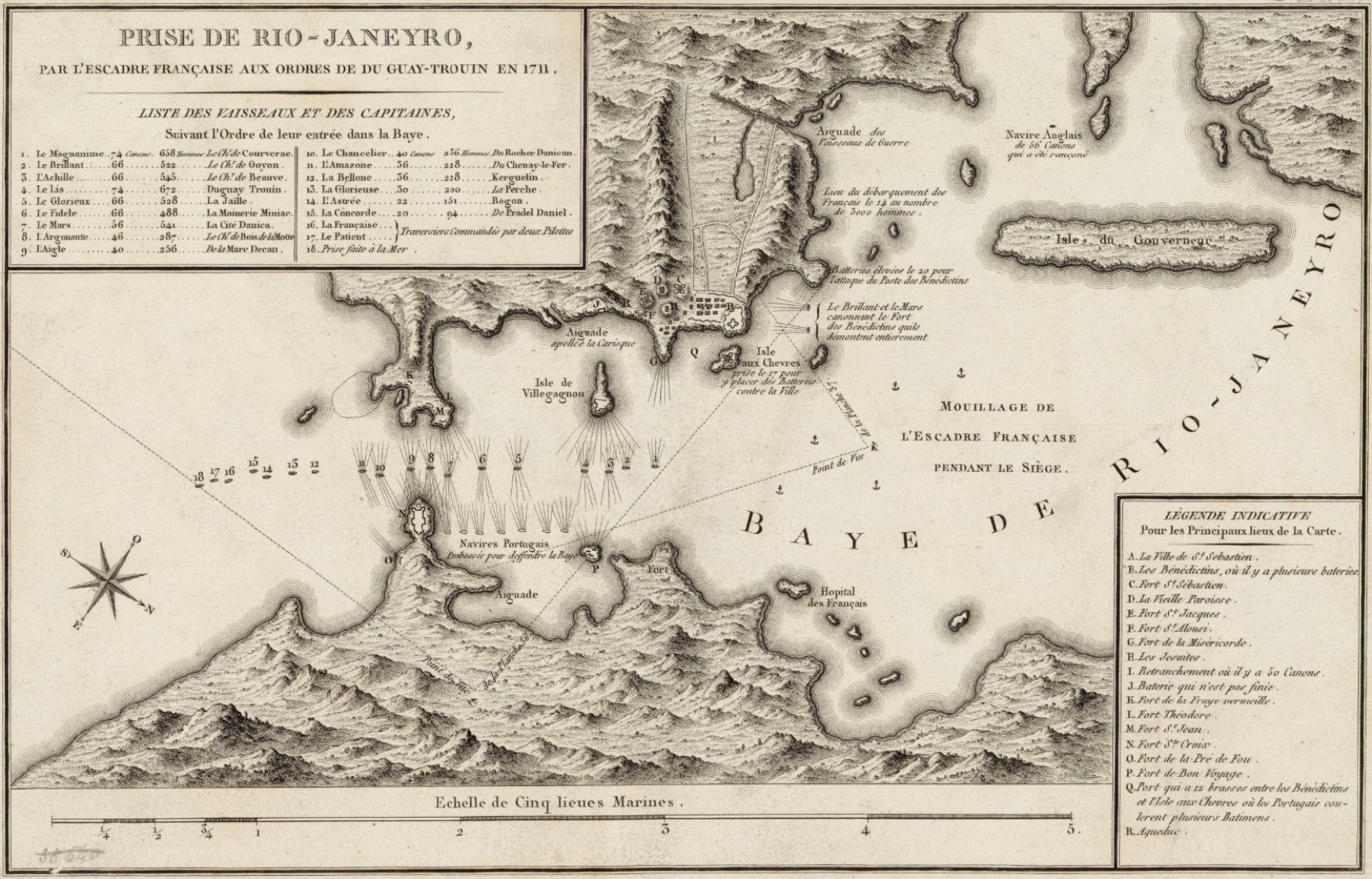
A map made Duguay-Trouin in 1711 depicting the French attack on Rio de Janeiro.

In 1702, as the War of the Spanish Succession was ongoing, he commanded two frigates, the Bellone and Railleuse. During this period, he formally became an officer in the French Navy. From 1704 to 1705, Duguay-Trouin commanded the warship Jason and captured the Royal Navy ships of the line HMS Elizabeth and HMS Coventry. On 21 October 1707, together with Claude de Forbin, he defeated a Royal Navy squadron commanded by Richard Edwards at the Battle at The Lizard.

In 1709, he captured the Royal Navy ship of the line HMS Bristol. In the same year he was ennobled by Louis XIV, choosing the motto Dedit haec insignia virtus ("Bravery awarded these honours"). By this point, he had captured 16 warships and over 300 merchant ships of varying sizes from the English and Dutch.

On 21 September 1711, in an 11-day battle, he captured Rio de Janeiro, then believed impregnable, with twelve ships and 6,000 men, in spite of the defence consisting of seven ships of the line, five forts, and 14 000-15 000 men; he held the governor for ransom. Duguay-Trouin captured large quantities of loot from Rio de Janeiro, including numerous Black slaves; he later sold these slaves at Cayenne, French Guiana. Investors in this venture doubled their money, and Duguay-Trouin earned a promotion to Lieutenant général de la Marine.

== Later career and death ==
In his late career, he commanded the fleet based in Saint-Malo, then the fleet based in Brest, the fleet for the East and eventually Toulon harbour. He died in 1736, after having written to Fleury to ask Louis XV to support his family.

== Personal memoirs ==
From 1720 to 1721, Duguay-Trouin wrote a set of personal memoirs for his family, initially having no intention of actually publishing them. However, he eventually changed his mind; the memoirs, edited for publication by Pierre Villepontoux, were published by Dutch publisher Pieter Mortier on 1730 in Amsterdam.

- Memoires de M. du Gué-Trouin, chef d'escadre des armées de S.M.T.C. et grand-croix de l'Ordre militaire de S. Louis. Amsterdam: Chez Pierre Mortier, 1730. [Publiés par P. Villepontoux].
- Memoires de Mr. du Gué-Trouin, chef d'escadre des armées de S.M.T.C. et grand-croix de l'Ordre militaire de S. Louis. A Londres [i.e. Amsterdam: Chez P. du Barri & E. Belton at the bee-hive St. Martin's Lane. [i.e. Pierre Mortier], 1730.
- Memoires de M. du Gué-Trouin, chef d'escadre des armées de S.M.T.C. et grand-croix de l'Ordre militaire de S. Louis. Amsterdam: Chez Pierre Mortier, 1746.
- Mémoires de Monsieur Du Guay-Trouin : lieutenant-général des armées navales, ... Augmentés de son Eloge par M. Thomas. Amsterdam: Pierre Mortier, 1769.
- Mémoires de Monsieur Du Guay-Trouin: lieutenant général des armées navales de France et commandeur de l'Ordre royal & militaire de Saint Louis. Augmenté de Son Éloge par M. Thomas. Amsterdam: Pierre Mortier, 1773 (facsimile, 1974). "Complément aux mémoires de Duguay-Trouin." 17 pages inserted.
- Mémoires de Monsieur du Guay-Trouin, lieutenant-général des armées navales, commandeur de l'Ordre royal & militaire de Saint-Louis. Nouvelle Édition. Paris, 1774. Reprinted from the authorized edition: Paris?: P.-F. Godart de Beauchamps, M.DCC.XL.
- Mémoires de Monsieur Du Guay-Troui: lieutenant-général des armées navales, ... Augmentés de son Eloge par M. Thomas. Rouen, 1779. 750 copies conforming to the Amsterdam edition of 1769.
- Des Mémoirs Relatif a L'Histoire de France. Mémoires de Duguay-Trouin Paris: Foucault, 1829, pp. 294 ff.

== In popular culture ==
Duguay-Trouin is mentioned in Volume II, "Within A Budding Grove", of Marcel Proust's In Search of Lost Time (previously published as Remembrance of Things Past). The reference occurs in an interlude section of the work entitled "Place Names: the Place" juxtaposed with other Impressionistic images. This reference specifically compares the brave image of the warrior's statue with the banal image of ordinary people eating sorbets in a bakery, illustrating that at the time, Duguay-Trouin's influence on French society was still so pervasive that statues of his form were commonplace.

== See also ==
- France Antarctique
