= Malafon =

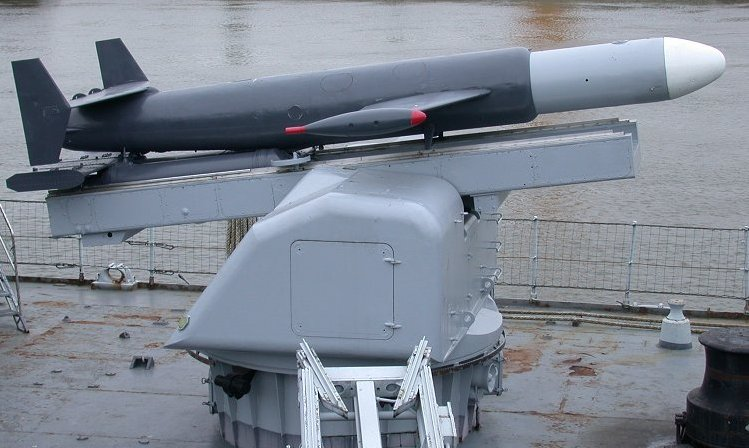
- Malafon launcher on the French destroyer Maillé-Brézé
- Type: Standoff Anti-submarine missile
- Place of origin: France

Service history
- In service: 1966–1997
- Used by: French Navy

Specifications
- Mass: 1,330 kg (2,930 lb)
- Length: 5.85 m (6.40 yd)
- Diameter: 0.65 m (0.71 yd)
- Warhead: 533 mm (21.0 in) L4 torpedo
- Engine: Solid propellant rocket motor
- Operational range: 10 km (6.2 mi)
- Maximum speed: 808 km/h (502 mph)
- Launch platform: Various French surface ships

Malafon (MArine LAtécoère FONds) was a French ship-launched anti-submarine missile system. Developed in the 1950s and 1960s, the weapon was intended to take advantage of the greater detection ranges possible with towed sonar arrays. The missile entered service in 1966 and was manufactured by Groupe Latécoère

The weapon is essentially a glider-delivered version of the L4 torpedo. The launcher is a circular mount, which allows the weapon to be rotated to the correct bearing, then fired at a fixed elevation of +15°. Two solid booster rockets accelerate it to 830 km/h (520 mph) within 4 seconds before falling away. The unpowered glider continues at an altitude of 100 metres (330 ft), altering course in mid-flight under radio control of the launch platform. Effective range was 13 km (8.1 mi). As it reaches the target, the glider drops the torpedo, which splashes into the sea and commences a circular search pattern. The range of the Malafon meant that it was expected to hit the water within 800 metres (2,600 ft) of the submarine's location. The L4 torpedo had a speed of 30 kn (56 km/h; 35 mph) over a range of 5 km (3.1 mi).

The Malafon was a large weapon, with each missile weighing 1,330 kg (2,930 lb). As a result, it was only employed on larger vessels. It was typically used for medium- and long-range submarine targets, though it could have been used against surface ships.

The system was never used at war. It was declared obsolete in 1997. It was replaced by Westland Lynx helicopters using Mark 46 torpedoes.

== Ships ==
The Malafon system was fitted to the following ship classes

- T 47-class destroyer
- T56 (La Galissonnière)
- Suffren-class frigate
- French frigate Aconit
- Tourville-class frigate

== Specifications ==
	Missile	Torpedo
Weight	1,330 kg (2,930 lb) with booster	540 kg (1,190 lb)
Speed	830 km/h (520 mph)	30 kn (56 km/h; 35 mph)
Range	13 km (8.1 mi)	5 km (3.1 mi)
Length	5.85 m (19.2 ft)	3.13 m (10.3 ft)

The missile had a 3.19 m (10.5 ft) wingspan, with the main body having a 65 cm (26 in) diameter. The torpedo had a 533 mm (21.0 in) diameter and could dive to 300 m (980 ft) depth.
