= Motte (surname) =

Motte, la Motte and de la Motte are French surnames. The Portuguese and Spanish version is Mota, and the Italian version is Motta. Notable people with the surname include:

- Antoine Houdar de la Motte (1672–1731), French author
- August de la Motte (1713–1788), Hanoverian general
- Benjamin Motte (1693–1738), English publisher
- Benjamin Motte Sr. (died 1710), English publisher
- Camille du Bois de la Motte (fl. 1789), French marchioness
- Capucine Motte (born 1971), Belgian writer
- Clarence Petersen de la Motte (1892–?), Australian sailor
- Diether de la Motte (1928–2010), German musician, composer, music theorist, and academic teacher
- Edme Joachim Bourdois de La Motte (1754–1835), French doctor
- Ellen N. La Motte (1873–1961), American nurse, journalist and author
- François Henri de la Motte (died 1781), French army officer
- Friedrich de la Motte Fouqué (1777–1843), German writer
- Heinrich August de la Motte Fouqué (1698–1774), French-Prussian lieutenant general
- Henri-Paul Motte (1846–1922), French painter
- Isaac Motte (1738–1795), American statesman
- Jason Motte (born 1982), American baseball player
- Jeanne-Marie Bouvier de la Motte-Guyon (1648–1717), French mystic
- Lisa de la Motte (born 1985), Swazi swimmer
- Marguerite De La Motte (1902–1950), American actress
- Nathaniel Motte (born 1984), American recording artist
- Nicholas de la Motte (1755–1831), French nobleman
- Pierre Lambert de la Motte (1624–1679), French bishop
- Toussaint-Guillaume Picquet de la Motte (1720–1791), French admiral
- Tyler Motte (born 1995), American ice hockey player

== See also ==
- Alfred Motté (1887–1918), French Olympian
- LaMotte (surname)
- Lamotte (surname)
- Mado Lamotte, stage name of Canadian drag queen Luc Provost
- Motte (disambiguation)
- Lamotte (disambiguation)
- Mote (surname)
