= Moat (disambiguation) =

A moat is a type of fortification.

Moat or Moats may also refer to:

== Places ==
- Moat, Cumbria, a hamlet in the parish of Kirkandrews on Esk in England
- Moat Park, a public park in Dundonald, Northern Ireland, UK

=== Municipalities ===
- Moats, Ohio, an unincorporated community in the US
- New Moat, a village and community in Wales
- Old Moat, an electoral district or ward in Manchester, England

=== Structures ===
- Moat House, Sutton Coldfield, a building in West Midlands, England
- Moat House, Tamworth, a building in Staffordshire, England

== People ==
- Moat (surname)
- Arthur Moats (born 1988), American football player
- Ryan Moats (born 1982), American former football player

== Enterprises and organizations ==
- Moat, an enterprise software company measuring digital media and marketing acquired by Oracle Corporation
- Moat Community College, a school in Leicester, England
- Moat Theatre, a theatre and arts centre in Ireland

== Other uses ==
- Economic moat, a term coined by Warren Buffett, to describe a sustainable competitive advantage
- Moat, a clear ring outside the eyewall of a tropical cyclone
- Gaussian moat problem, an unsolved problem in mathematics
- Ministry of All the Talents, a British government of 1806–7
- The Mother of All Talk Shows, a talk show hosted by George Galloway
- Moat Park Rangers F.C., a football club in Northern Ireland, UK

== See also ==
- Mote (disambiguation)
- Motte (disambiguation)
