= Mott (disambiguation) =

Mott is a surname and given name.

Mott may also refer to:

== Places ==
=== United States ===
- Mott, Missouri, a ghost town
- Mott, North Dakota, a city
- Fort Mott (New Jersey), a military fort built on the Delaware River following the American Civil War
- Fort Mott (Vermont), a picket fort used during the American Revolutionary War
- Mott Archaeological Preserve or Mott Mounds Site, an archaeological site in Franklin Parish, Louisiana
- Mott Street, Manhattan, New York
- Mott Athletic Center, a multi-purpose stadium on the campus of California Polytechnic State University, California
- Mott Bridge, a historic bridge in Oregon

=== Other places ===
- Mott Snowfield, Graham Land, Antarctica
- 52291 Mott, an asteroid

== Science ==
- Mycobacteria other than tuberculosis or nontuberculous mycobacteria
- Nevill Mott Medal and Prize, awarded by the Institute of Physics for research in condensed matter or materials physics
- Charles S. Mott Prize, awarded annually by the General Motors Cancer Research Foundation
- Mott problem, historic issue in quantum mechanics
- Mott scattering, a form of Coulomb scattering developed by Nevill Francis Mott in 1929.

== Entertainment ==
- Mott the Hoople, and English rock band that was briefly renamed "Mott" from 1974 to 1976
- Mott (album), by Mott the Hoople

== Other uses ==
- Mott baronets, a title in the Baronetage of the United Kingdom
- Mott Community College, Flint, Michigan
- Mott School and Second Street School, Trenton, New Jersey, two former school buildings on the National Register of Historic Places
- Mott MacDonald, a civil engineering consultancy
- Mott, Hay and Anderson, a firm of consulting civil engineers – merged into Mott MacDonald

== See also ==
- Mott's, an American company that primarily produces apple-based products
- Mott's Regiment of Militia, a unit in the American Revolutionary War
- Charles Mott-Radclyffe (1911–1992), British politician
- La Mott, Pennsylvania, an unincorporated community in the US
- Mote (disambiguation)
- Motte (disambiguation)
