= Mot =

Mot or MOT may refer to:

- Montserrat, UNDP country code

== Media ==
- Ministry of Truth, the propaganda ministry in George Orwell 1949 novel Nineteen Eighty-Four
- mot (magazine), former German car magazine
- Mot (Star Trek), a minor character in Star Trek: The Next Generation
- Mot (TV series), a French children's animated television series
- Mot (band), South Korean indie rock band
- M.O.T. (group), American hip hop group
- Mot (rapper) (born 1990), Russian rapper and singer

== Religion ==
- Mot (god), the Semitic god of death

== Science and technology ==
- Magneto-optical trap in physics
- Molecular orbital theory in chemistry
- Occupational therapy, MOT is the short form for Masters of Occupational Therapy

== Transport ==
- Minot International Airport, in North Dakota, by IATA code
- Minot (Amtrak station), by Amtrak code
- Motspur Park railway station, London, by National Rail station code

== Organizations ==
- MOT (gallery), a gallery for contemporary art in London and Brussels
- MOT (charity), a Norwegian anti-drug and violence organization
- #MOT, a hash tag used to show affiliation with Leeds United A.F.C. based on the chorus of "Leeds! Leeds! Leeds!"
- Motorola, (NYSE symbol:MOT)
- Michigan Opera Theatre
- The Ministry of Transport of many countries. In the UK, the acronym also lends its name to:

- MOT test, an annual test for roadworthiness
- MOT types 1/2/3 of foundational sub-base aggregate used for road construction

- Museum for Old Techniques in Grimbergen, Belgium
- Museum of Tolerance, a multimedia museum in Los Angeles, California

== See also ==
- Moment of Truth (disambiguation)
- Mott (disambiguation)
- Mote (disambiguation)
