= William Mott =

William Mott may refer to:

- William Mott (British Columbia politician) (1894–1961), Canadian electrician and member of Parliament from British Columbia
- William A. Mott (1864–1911), Canadian lawyer and politician from New Brunswick
- William I. Mott (born 1953), American horse trainer
- William Penn Mott Jr. (1902–1992), director of the United States National Park Service
- Bill Mott (soldier) (born 1957), most senior NCO in the British Army

== See also ==
- Mott
