= Mote =

A mote is a small bit of substance, such as a fleck or particle.

Mote may also refer to:

== Art and entertainment ==
- The Motes, a Canadian indie-rock band active in the 1990s
- "Mote", a song by Sonic Youth from their 1990 album Goo
- "Mote", a song by The Faint on the 2001 vinyl EP recording Mote/Dust
- Mote, a fairy character in A Midsummer Night's Dream
- The Mote and the Beam, a parable
- The Mote in God's Eye, a science fiction novel

== Other uses ==
- Mote (surname) (including a list of people with the name)
- Mote (food), various types of cooked grains consumed in South America
- Mote con huesillo, a non-alcoholic drink from Chile
- Mote spoon, a type of spoon used when preparing tea
- Mote (sensor), a node in a wireless sensor network
- Mote Park, a park in Maidstone, England
  - Mote Park (cricket ground), the home ground of The Mote Cricket Club within the park
- Mote Demesne, a townland in County Roscommon, Ireland; see List of townlands of County Roscommon
- Mote Marine Laboratory, a marine research organization in Sarasota, Florida, US
- Ightham Mote, a medieval moated manor house in Kent, England.

== See also ==
- Moat (disambiguation)
- Moot (disambiguation)
- Mot (disambiguation)
- Motte (disambiguation)
