= Mott =

Mott is both an English surname and given name. Notable people with the name include:

== Surname ==
=== B ===
- Basil Mott (1859–1938), British civil engineer
- Bitsy Mott (1918–2001), American baseball player

=== C ===
- Catherine R. Mott (1836–1880), American inventor
- Charles Francis Mott (1877–1967), English physicist and educator
- Charles James Mott (1880–1918), British baritone
- Charles Stewart Mott (1875–1973), American businessman
- Charles T. Mott, architect in the United States
- Christopher Mott, American academic

=== D ===
- Dan Mott (fl. 2000 – 2007), American actor
- Darren Mott, Baron Mott (born 1973), British politician

=== E ===
- Edward John Mott (1893–1967), British soldier
- Elias Bertram Mott (1897–1961), American politician

=== F ===
- Frank Luther Mott (1886–1964), American historian
- Frederick Walker Mott (1853–1926), British biochemist

=== G ===
- Gershom Mott (1822–1884), American army officer
- Gordon Newell Mott (1812–1887), American Congressman from Nevada

=== J ===
- James Mott (1788–1868), American Quaker leader, husband of Lucretia
- James Mott (New Jersey politician) (1739–1823), American Congressman from New Jersey
- James Wheaton Mott (1883–1945), American Congressman from Oregon
- Jamie Mott (born 1988/1989), Australian jockey
- Joe Mott (born 1956), American football player
- John De Mott (1790–1870), American Congressman from New York
- John Raleigh Mott (1865–1955), American YMCA leader
- Jordan Lawrence Mott (1799–c. 1870), American industrialist

=== L ===
- Lawrence Mott (1881–1931), American novelist, grandson of Jordan L. Mott Jr.
- Lewis Freeman Mott (1863–1941), American academic
- Lucretia Mott (1793–1880), American Quaker leader, wife of James
- Luiz Mott (born 1946), Brazilian civil rights activist
- Luther W. Mott (1874–1923), American Congressman from New York

=== M ===
- Marion Mott-McGrath (born 1940), Australian chess player
- Matthew Mott (born 1973), Australian cricketer
- Michael Mott (1930–2019), British-American author
- Mildred Mott Wedel (1912–1995), American scholar of Great Plains archaeology and ethnohistory
- Morris Mott (born 1946), Canadian ice hockey player

=== N ===
- Nevill Francis Mott (1905–1996), British physicist

=== P ===
- Peter De Mott (1947–2009), American peace activist

=== R ===
- Richard Mott (politician) (1804–1888), American Congressman from Ohio
- Ricky Mott (born 1981), Australian AFL footballer
- Rodney Mott (fl. 1998 – 2007), American basketball referee
- Ruth Mott (1917–2012), British television cook

=== S ===
- Shane Mott, Australian & Dutch Cricketer
- Stephen Charles Mott (born 1940), American academic
- Steve Mott (American football) (born 1961), American footballer
- Stewart Rawlings Mott (1937–2008), American philanthropist

=== V ===
- Valentine Mott (1785–1865), American surgeon

=== W ===
- William Albert Mott (1864–1911), Canadian politician from New Brunswick
- William I. Mott (born 1953), American horse trainer
- William Malcolm Mott (1894–1961), Canadian politician from British Columbia
- William Penn Mott Jr. (1909–1992), American landscape architect

== Given name or nickname ==
- Mott T. Greene, American historian of science and professor
- Mott B. Schmidt (1889–1977), American architect
- Morrison Waite (1816–1888), nicknamed "Mott", American attorney, politician and seventh Chief Justice of the United States

== Fictional characters ==
- Dandy Mott, antagonist of the television series American Horror Story: Freak Show, portrayed by Finn Wittrock
- Wilfred Mott, a recurring Doctor Who character
- Ernie Mott, protagonist of the 1944 film None but the Lonely Heart, played by Cary Grant
- Norman Mott, protagonist of Mott the Hoople, a 1966 novel by Willard Manus
- Mott, protagonist in the Five Nights at Freddy's franchise, first appearing in the story Sea Bonnies

== See also ==
- Mote (disambiguation)
- Motte (disambiguation)
