= LaMotte (surname) =

LaMotte is a surname, and may refer to:

- Bobby LaMotte (1898–1970), American baseball player
- Louis LaMotte (1896–1984), American business executive
- Loulou LaMotte (born 1981), Swedish singer
- Peter LaMotte (1929–2007), American physician

== See also ==
- Lamotte (surname)
- Motte (surname)
