= Muth =

Muth may refer to:

== People ==
- Christa Muth – German systems scientist (born 1949)
- Chuck Muth, former Nevada Republican Party executive director
- Ellen Muth, American actress
- Esteban Muth – Belgian-German racing driver
- John Muth, American economist
- Jon J Muth, American comic book artist
- Katie Muth – Pennsylvanian Democratic party politician (1983 -)
- Karl Muth, German commentator
- Peter J. De Muth, U.S. House of Representatives member
- Richard Muth, American urban economist
- Sergiu Muth – Romanian footballer (born 1990)

== Animals ==
- Muth (horse), an American thoroughbred horse

== See also ==
- Mot (disambiguation)
- Frankenmuth, Michigan, nicknamed "Muth"
