= List of Amazon Freevee original programming =

Amazon Freevee is an American ad-supported streaming service owned by Amazon that launched in January 2019 as IMDb Freedive. It was previously branded as IMDb TV when it began producing original programming, until rebranding to Amazon Freevee in April 2022.

In November 2024, it was announced that Freevee would shut down. Its original programming was moved to Amazon Prime Video and the service became unavailable in August 2025.

== Original programming ==
=== Drama ===
Title	Genre	Premiere	Seasons	Length	Status
Alex Rider	Spy thriller	June 4, 2020	3 seasons, 24 episodes	43–49 min	Ended
Leverage: Redemption	Action crime drama	July 9, 2021	2 seasons, 29 episodes	40–54 min	Continued (Note: Continued on Amazon Prime Video for season 3)
Bosch: Legacy	Crime drama	May 6, 2022	2 seasons, 20 episodes	41–54 min	Continued (Note: Continued on Amazon Prime Video for season 3)
High School	Coming-of-age drama	October 14, 2022	1 season, 8 episodes	22–30 min	Ended
Classified	Coming-of-age drama	August 22, 2024	1 season, 8 episodes	36–44 min	Ended

=== Comedy ===
Title	Genre	Premiere	Seasons	Length	Status
Sprung	Crime comedy	August 19, 2022	1 season, 9 episodes	35–40 min	Ended
Jury Duty	Mockumentary	April 7, 2023	1 season, 8 episodes	26–30 min	Continued (Note: Continued on Amazon Prime Video for season 2 onward)
Primo	Coming-of-age comedy drama	May 19, 2023	1 season, 8 episodes	23–28 min	Ended
Dinner with the Parents	Sitcom	April 18, 2024	1 season, 10 episodes	24–28 min	Ended
The Pradeeps of Pittsburgh	Comedy	October 17, 2024	1 season, 8 episodes	25–32 min	Ended

=== Adult animation ===
Title	Genre	Premiere	Seasons	Length	Status
You're Not a Monster	Horror comedy	October 10, 2019	1 season, 10 episodes	4–5 min	Ended

=== Non-English language scripted ===
Title	Genre	Premiere	Seasons	Length	Language(s)	Status
Casa Grande	Drama	May 1, 2023	5 episodes	42–48 min	English; Spanish	Miniseries

=== Unscripted ===
==== Docuseries ====
Title	Subject	Premiere	Seasons	Length	Language	Status
Uninterrupted's Top Class	Sports	February 25, 2021	4 seasons, 26 episodes	21–37 min	English	Ended
Moment of Truth	True crime	April 2, 2021	1 season, 5 episodes	26–52 min	English	Ended
Luke Bryan: My Dirt Road Diary	Music	August 6, 2021	1 season, 5 episodes	24–35 min	English	Ended
Bug Out	True crime	March 4, 2022	1 season, 4 episodes	35–37 min	English	Ended
God. Family. Football.	Sports	September 1, 2023	6 episodes	32–36 min	English	Miniseries
Uninterrupted's Top Class Tennis	Sports	July 18, 2024	4 episodes	29–34 min	English	Miniseries

==== Reality ====
Title	Genre	Premiere	Seasons	Length	Language	Status
Judy Justice	Arbitration-based reality court show	November 1, 2021	3 seasons, 375 episodes	21–24 min	English	Continued (Note: Continued on Amazon Prime Video for season 4)
Play-Doh Squished	Reality competition	December 9, 2021 (Note: Originally premiered as a one-off holiday special)	1 season, 16 episodes	42–45 min	English	Ended
Hollywood Houselift with Jeff Lewis	Reality	June 10, 2022	2 seasons, 20 episodes	40–48 min	English	Ended
America's Test Kitchen: The Next Generation	Cooking competition	December 9, 2022	1 season, 10 episodes	49–56 min	English	Continued (Note: Continued on Amazon Prime Video for season 2)
Dr. Seuss Baking Challenge	Cooking competition	December 13, 2022	1 season, 8 episodes	44–59 min	English	Ended
Tribunal Justice	Arbitration-based reality court show	June 9, 2023	1 season, 130 episodes	24–28 min	English	Continued (Note: Continued on Amazon Prime Video for season 2 onward)
Twin Love	Dating show	November 17, 2023	1 season, 9 episodes	41–55 min	English	Ended
The GOAT	Reality competition	May 9, 2024	1 season, 10 episodes	41–51 min	English	Ended

==== Variety ====
Title	Genre	Premiere	Seasons	Length	Language	Status
Jokah & Tutty	Sketch comedy/stand-up comedy/variety show	November 30, 2023	1 season, 10 episodes	31–37 min	German	Ended
Counsel Culture	Talk show	June 6, 2024	1 season, 9 episodes	29–44 min	English	Ended

=== Continuations ===
These shows have been picked up by Amazon Freevee for additional seasons after having aired previous seasons on another network.

Title	Genre	Prev. network(s)	Premiere	Seasons	Runtime	Language	Status
Almost Paradise (season 2)	Crime drama	WGN America	July 21, 2023	1 season, 10 episodes	42–50 min	English	Ended
7 vs. Wild (seasons 3–4)	Reality	YouTube	October 31, 2023	2 seasons, 32 episodes	59–69 min	German	Ended

=== Co-productions ===
Title	Genre	Partner/Region	Premiere	Seasons	Length	Status
Neighbours (seasons 39–40)	Soap opera	Network 10/Australia	September 18, 2023	2 seasons, 263 episodes	25 min	Ended
Boat Story	Thriller	BBC One/United Kingdom	March 12, 2024	6 episodes	55–59 min	Miniseries

=== Exclusive international distributions ===
These shows have been acquired and/or by Amazon Freevee for exclusive first-run release in certain countries or territories in deals with partners in other regions.

==== Drama ====
Title	Genre	Original network/Region	Premiere	Seasons	Length	Exclusive region(s)	Status
Pretty Hard Cases	Crime comedy drama	CBC TV/Canada	September 10, 2021	3 seasons, 32 episodes	44 min	United States	Ended
Troppo	Crime drama	ABC TV/Australia	May 20, 2022	2 seasons, 16 episodes	53–60 min	United States	Ended

==== Comedy ====
Title	Genre	Original network/Region	Premiere	Seasons	Length	Exclusive region(s)	Status
Timewasters	Sitcom	ITV2/United Kingdom	June 11, 2021	2 seasons, 12 episodes	22–23 min	United States	Ended
Moonshine	Comedy drama	CBC TV/Canada	March 10, 2023	2 seasons, 16 episodes	44 min	United Kingdom	Ended

==== Animation ====
===== Adult animation =====
Title	Genre	Original network/Region	Premiere	Seasons	Length	Exclusive region(s)	Status
Corner Gas Animated	Animated sitcom	CTV Comedy Channel/Canada	October 3, 2019	4 seasons, 48 episodes	21–23 min	United States and United Kingdom	Ended

=== Specials ===
Title	Genre	Premiere	Runtime
Dinner Party Diaries with José Andrés	Cooking show/Talk show	March 19, 2024	33 min

=== Feature films ===
Title	Genre	Release	Runtime
Love Accidentally	Romantic comedy	July 15, 2022	1 hour, 25 min
Post Malone: Runaway	Concert film	August 12, 2022	1 hour, 5 min
Hotel for the Holidays	Romantic comedy	December 2, 2022	1 hour, 24 min
Rowdy	Documentary	February 3, 2023	1 hour, 41 min
Monumental: Ellie Goulding at Kew Gardens	Concert film	March 31, 2023	53 min
Puppy Love	Romantic comedy	August 18, 2023	1 hour, 46 min
EXmas	Romantic comedy	November 17, 2023	1 hour, 33 min
