= Mount Hunt =

Mount Hunt may refer to:

- Mount Hunt (Antarctica)
- Mount Hunt (Wyoming), a mountain peak in Grand Teton National Park, Wyoming, USA
