= Kiebitz =

Kiebitz is German for Lapwing, it may also refer to:

- Focke-Wulf S 24 Kiebitz, a German sport aircraft of the 1920s
- Italian ship Ramb III, seized by the Germans in World War II and renamed Kiebitz
- Operation Kiebitz, a failed World War II attempt to free German prisoners of war
- Platzer Kiebitz, a German homebuilt biplane design
