= Mote (surname) =

Mote is an English surname, a variant of the surname Moat. Notable people with the name include:

- Ashley Mote (1936–2020), English politician, former member of the European parliament
- C. Daniel Mote Jr. (born 1937), President of the National Academy of Engineering
- David Mote (1940–2010), NASCAR driver
- Donald Mote (1900–1968), Justice of the Indiana Supreme Court
- Edward Mote (1797–1874), English pastor
- Frederick W. Mote (1922–2005), American sinologist and a professor of history
- George William Mote (1832–1909), English painter
- James Orin Mote (1922–2006), a bishop in Indiana, USA
- Kelley Mote (1923–2015), American football player
- Lauren Mote (born 1997), English actress
- William Henry Mote (1803–1871), English stipple and line engraver

== See also ==
- Mote Terukaio, a politician in Kiribati
- Motte (surname)
