= Cape De la Motte =

Prominent cape in George V Land in Antarctica

Coordinates: 67°0′S 144°25′E

Cape De la Motte is a prominent cape in George V Land in Antarctica separating Watt Bay and Buchanan Bay. Just to the south, the continental ice surface rises 520 metres (1,700 ft) at Mount Hunt. The cape was charted by the Australasian Antarctic Expedition (1911–14) under Douglas Mawson, who named it for C. P. de la Motte, third officer on the expedition ship Aurora. It has been conjectured that the high land behind this cape is "Point Case", which the United States Exploring Expedition (1838–42) under Lieutenant Charles Wilkes saw from what was called "Disappointment Bay" on January 23, 1840.
