= Huntwing =

British ultralight trike

General information
- Type: Homebuilt ultralight trike
- National origin: United Kingdom
- Designer: John Hunt
- Status: Plans available (2015)
- Number built: 20

History
- First flight: 1982

The Huntwing is a British ultralight trike that was designed by John Hunt of Clydach, Monmouthshire. The aircraft is supplied in the form of plans for amateur construction.

== Design and development ==
The Huntwing was designed to comply with the British BCAR Section S microlight category. It was first flown in 1982 and introduced commercially in 1992. It features a cable-braced hang glider-style high-wing, weight-shift controls, a two-seats-in-tandem open cockpit with a cockpit fairing, tricycle landing gear with wheel pants and a single engine in pusher configuration.

The aircraft is made from bolted-together aluminium tubing, with its 75% double surface wing covered in Dacron sailcloth. The 33.4 ft (10.2 m) span wing is supported by a single tube-type kingpost, uses an "A" frame weight-shift control bar, has a nose angle of 121°, 24 top and six bottom battens and has a wing area of 161 sq ft (15.0 m^{2}). The acceptable power range is 50 to 64 hp (37 to 48 kW) and the standard powerplants used include the twin cylinder, liquid-cooled, two-stroke 52 hp (39 kW) Rotax 462 snowmobile engine, the twin cylinder, air-cooled, two-stroke 50 hp (37 kW) Rotax 503 aircraft engine and the twin cylinder, liquid-cooled, two-stroke, dual-ignition 64 hp (48 kW) Rotax 582 powerplant. The BMW R100RS four-stroke motorcycle engine can also be fitted.

The plans wing is built by the amateur-builder and fitted with a Top Flight Sails sail. Alternatively a Mainair Blade wing can be used.

The manufacturer estimates the construction time from the supplied plans as 500 hours.

== Operational history ==
The designers says that 10 sets of plans have been shipped and about 20 aircraft completed and flown.

In May 2015 eleven examples were registered in the United Kingdom with the Civil Aviation Authority.

== Specifications (Huntwing 462LC) ==
Data from Designer

General characteristics

- Crew: one
- Capacity: one passenger
- Wingspan: 33.4 ft (10.2 m)
- Wing area: 161 sq ft (15.0 m^{2})
- Aspect ratio: 7.25:1
- Gross weight: 820 lb (372 kg)
- Fuel capacity: 50 litres (11 imp gal; 13 US gal)
- Powerplant: 1 × Rotax 462 twin cylinder, liquid-cooled, two stroke aircraft engine, with a 2.58:1 reduction drive, 52 hp (39 kW)
- Propellers: 3-bladed Ivoprop, 5 ft 4 in (1.63 m) diameter

Performance

- Maximum speed: 70 mph (110 km/h, 61 kn)
- Cruise speed: 60 mph (97 km/h, 52 kn)
- Never exceed speed: 74 mph (119 km/h, 64 kn)
- g limits: +4/-2
- Rate of climb: 700 ft/min (3.6 m/s)
- Wing loading: 5.1 lb/sq ft (24.8 kg/m^{2})
