= Guerpont Autoplum =

French ultralight aircraft

Autoplum

General information
- Type: Ultralight aircraft
- National origin: France
- Manufacturer: Roland Mangeard (plans)
- Designer: Maurice Guerpont
- Status: Plans available (2015)

The Guerpont Autoplum is a French ultralight aircraft that was designed by Maurice Guerpont. Plans are supplied by one of the first builders of the type, Roland Mangeard of Pulnoy. The aircraft is supplied as plans only for amateur construction.

== Design and development ==
The aircraft was designed to comply with the Fédération Aéronautique Internationale microlight rules. It features a cantilever low-wing, a two-seats-in-side-by-side configuration enclosed cockpit under an aircraft canopy with gull winged doors for access, fixed conventional landing gear and a single engine in tractor configuration.

The aircraft is made from wood, with its flying surfaces covered in doped aircraft fabric. The Autoplum's tailplane is 50% the area of the main wing, which provides a wide centre of gravity range and a high degree of pitch dampening. Its 8.60 m (28.2 ft) span wing, has an area of 17.50 m^{2} (188.4 sq ft). Earlier examples were fitted with a 51 hp (38 kW) Rotax 462 two-stroke engine, with later ones using the 64 hp (48 kW) Rotax 582 two-stroke powerplant or other engines.

== Specifications (Autoplum) ==
Data from Bayerl and Tacke

General characteristics

- Crew: one
- Capacity: one passenger
- Wingspan: 8.60 m (28 ft 3 in)
- Wing area: 17.50 m^{2} (188.4 sq ft)
- Empty weight: 230 kg (507 lb)
- Gross weight: 420 kg (926 lb)
- Fuel capacity: 50 litres (11 imp gal; 13 US gal)
- Powerplant: 1 × Rotax 462 two cylinder, air-cooled, two stroke aircraft engine, 39 kW (52 hp)
- Propellers: 2-bladed composite, ground adjustable

Performance

- Maximum speed: 150 km/h (93 mph, 81 kn)
- Cruise speed: 140 km/h (87 mph, 76 kn)
- Stall speed: 50 km/h (31 mph, 27 kn)
- Rate of climb: 4 m/s (790 ft/min)
- Wing loading: 24.0 kg/m^{2} (4.9 lb/sq ft)
