= Joigny =

- Commune
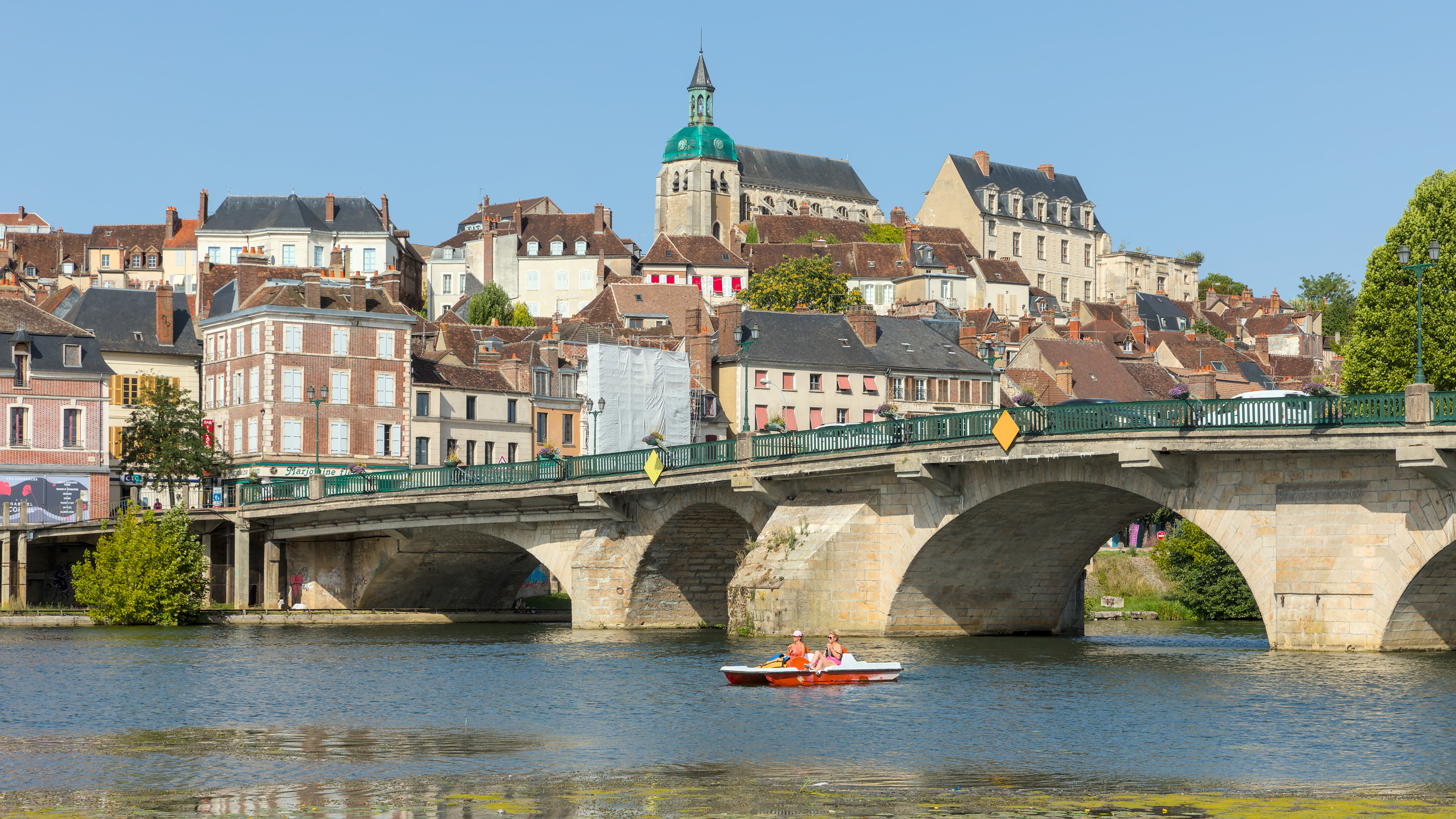

- Coat of arms
- Location of Joigny
- Location within France Location within Bourgogne-Franche-Comté
- Coordinates: 47°58′59″N 3°23′52″E
- Country: France
- Region: Bourgogne-Franche-Comté
- Department: Yonne
- Arrondissement: Sens
- Canton: Joigny
- Intercommunality: Jovinien

Government
  - Mayor (2020–2026): Nicolas Soret
- Area^{1}: 46.67 km^{2} (18.02 sq mi)
- Elevation: 96 m (315 ft)
- Highest elevation: 252 m (827 ft)
- Lowest elevation: 74 m (243 ft)
- Population (2023): 9,016
  - Density: 193.2/km^{2} (500.3/sq mi)
- Time zone: UTC+01:00 (CET)
  - Summer (DST): UTC+02:00 (CEST)
- INSEE/Postal code: 89206 /89300
- ^{1} French Land Register data, which excludes lakes, ponds, glaciers > 1 km^{2} (0.386 sq mi or 247 acres) and river estuaries.

Joigny (French pronunciation: [ʒwaɲi]) is a commune in the Yonne département in Bourgogne-Franche-Comté in north-central France.

It is located on the banks of the river Yonne.

== History ==
The current city, originally known as Joviniacum in Latin, was founded during Roman times by Flavius Jovinus prefect of the Roman militia in Gaul in AD 369.

During medieval times, it was fortified as a stronghold at the end of the 10th century by Renard I the Old, Count of Sens, on part of the lands of the Sainte-Marie du Charnier de Sens Abbey. The Porte du Bois, a gateway with two massive flanking towers, is a relic of the castle.

After passing through several hands, it came into the possession of the family of Villeroi in the 18th century. A fragment of a ladder preserved in the church of St André commemorates the successful resistance offered by the town to the English in 1429.

== Population ==
Historical population
Year	Pop.	±% p.a.
1968	9,698	—
1975	10,972	+1.78%
1982	9,644	−1.83%
1990	9,697	+0.07%
1999	10,032	+0.38%
2007	10,605	+0.70%
2012	9,800	−1.57%
2017	9,580	−0.45%
2023	9,016	−1.01%
Source: INSEE

== Some notable people ==
- Marcel Aymé
- Edme Joachim Bourdois de La Motte, first physician to Napoleon's son
- Yom Tov of Joigny, Rabbi and poet
- Anne Plantagenet
- Jean de Joigny
- François de Saint-Just (1896-1989), French politician

It was also the home of Saint Madeleine Sophie Barat, who founded the Roman Catholic Society of the Sacred Heart in 1800.

== Churches ==
- The church of St Jean (16th century), which once stood within the enceinte of the old castle, contains a representation (15th century) of the Holy Sepulchre in white marble.
- The church of St André (12th, 16th and 17th centuries), of which the best feature is the Renaissance portal with its fine bas-reliefs.
- The church of St Thibault (16th century), in which the stone crown suspended from the choir vaulting is chiefly noticeable.
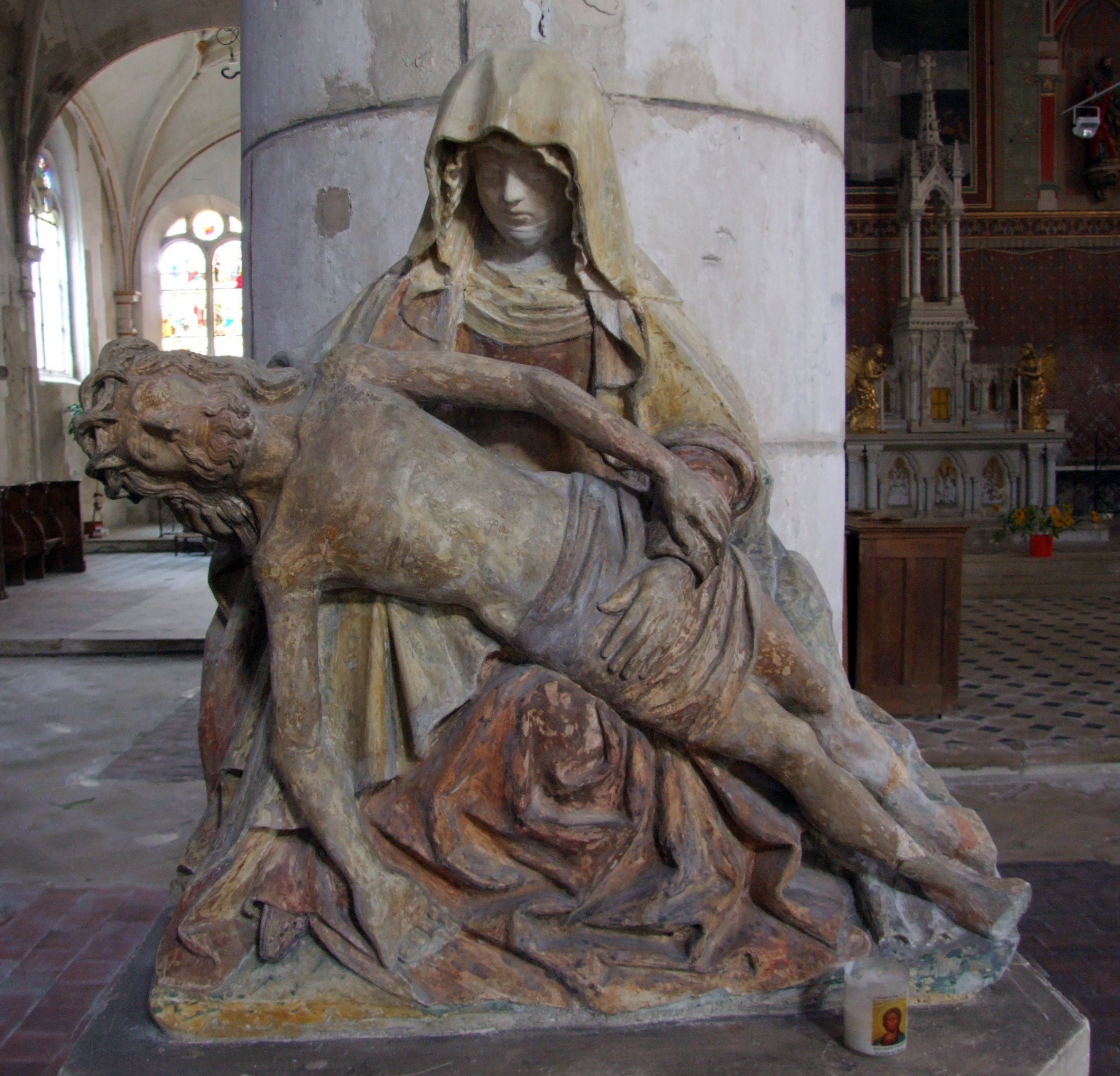
Saint Andrew Church, Pietà

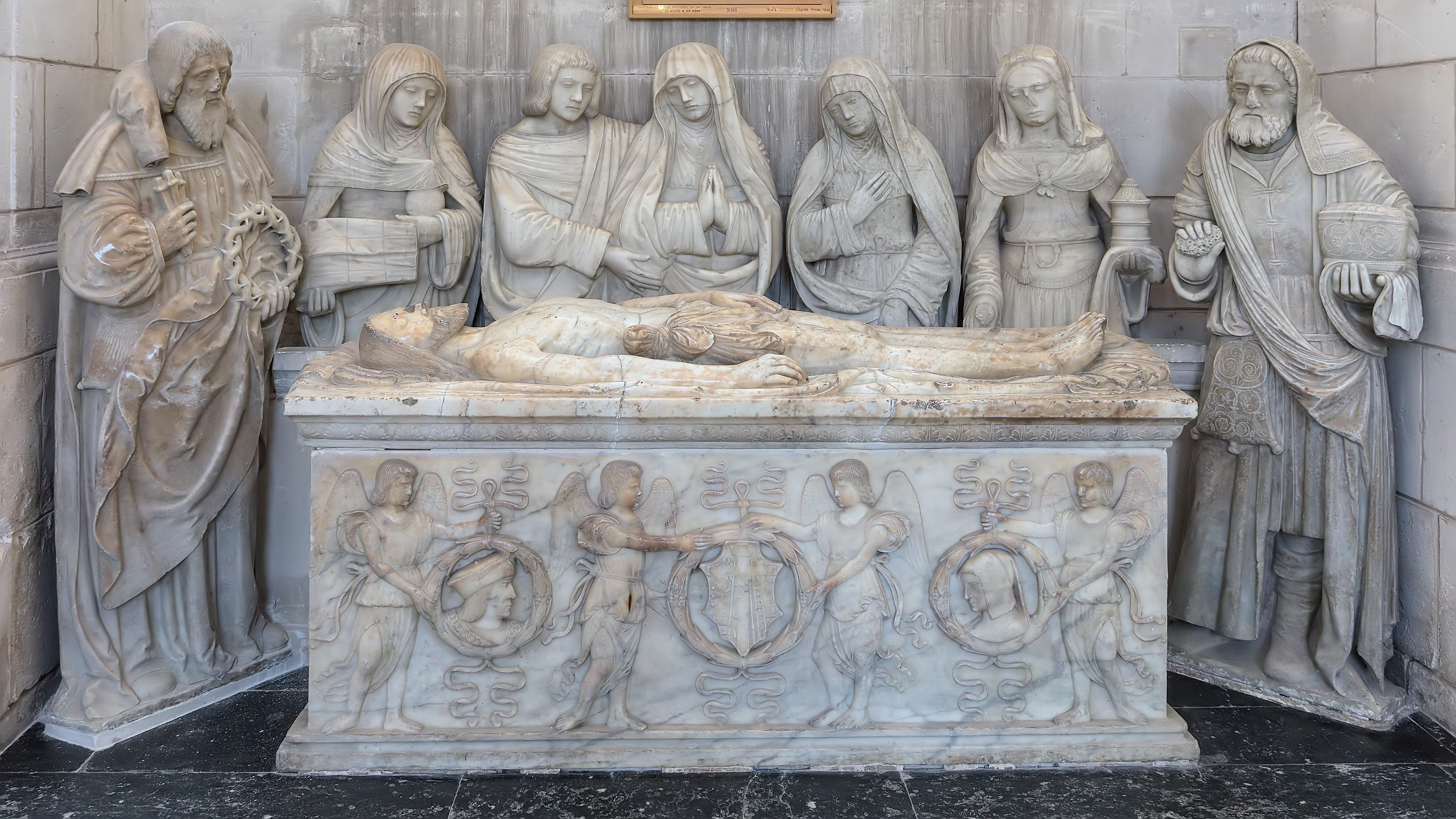
Saint John Church, Deposition of Christ (16th century)

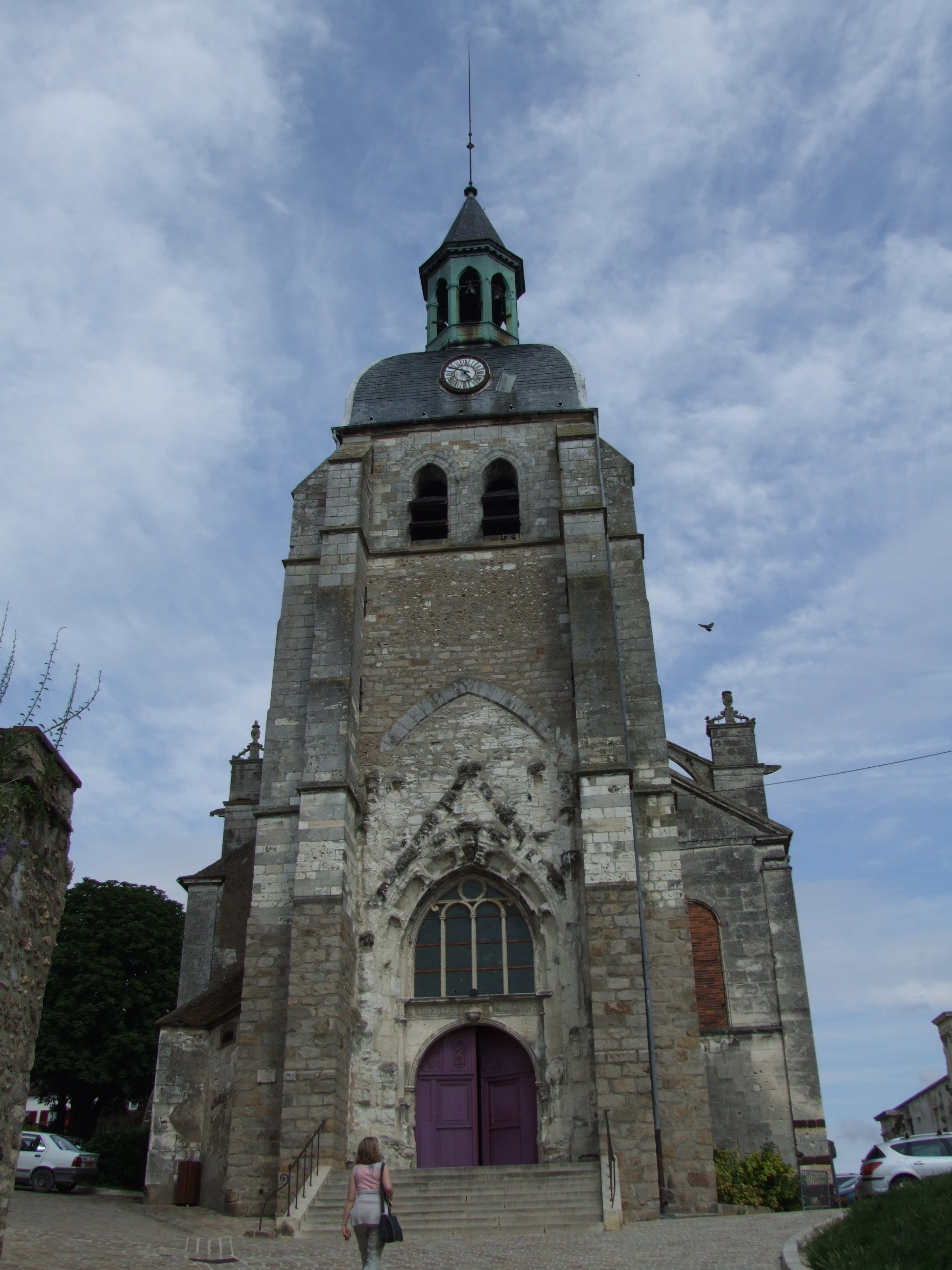
Saint John Church

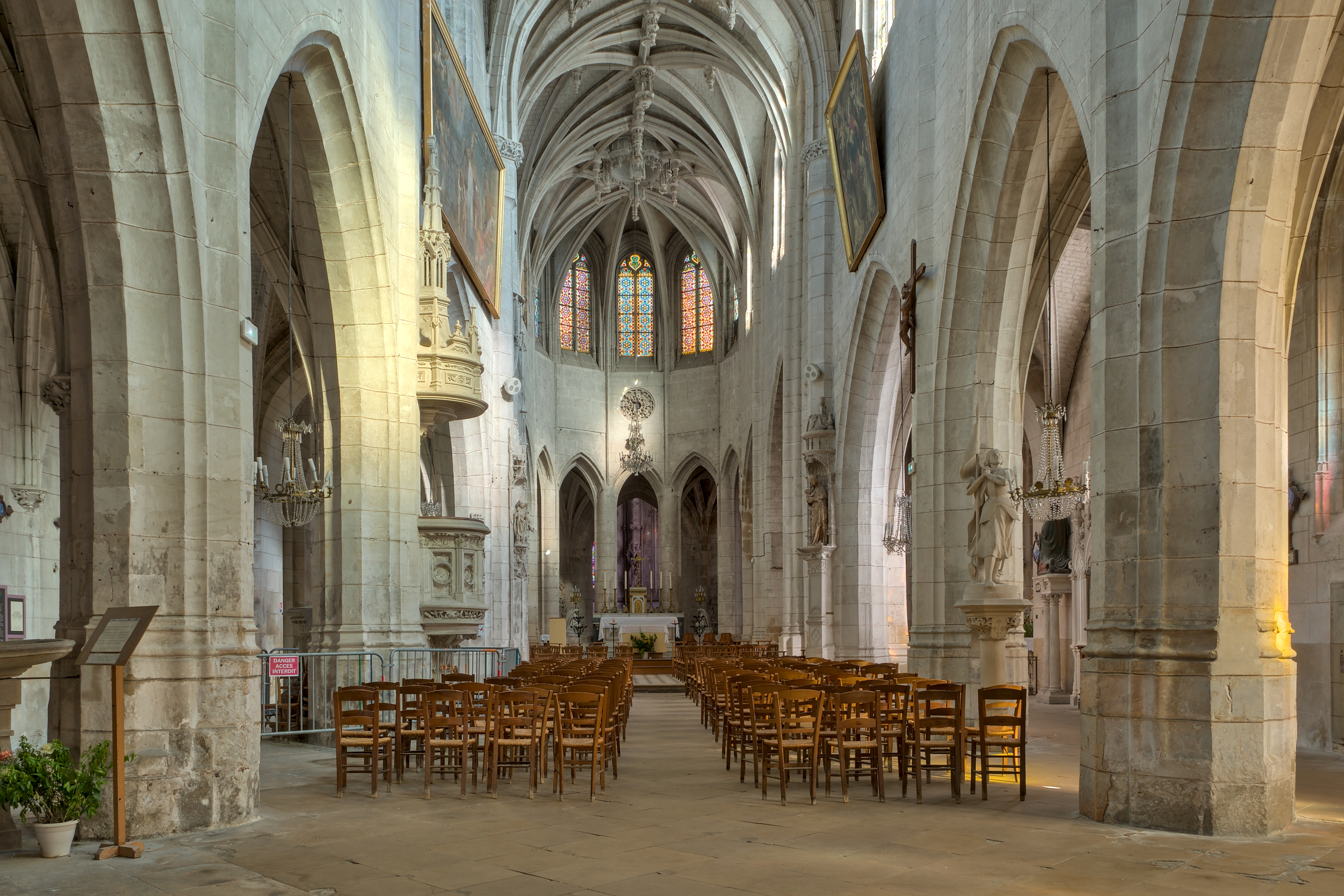
Inside of Saint Theobald Church

== Twin towns – sister cities ==
Joigny is twinned with:

- Mayen, Germany (1964)
- Godalming, England, United Kingdom (1985)
- Hanover, United States (1993)
- Joigny-sur-Meuse, France (2004)
- Amelia, Italy (2005)
- Kilibo, Benin (2011)

== Climate ==
Climate data for Joigny (1990-2010 averages)
Month	Jan	Feb	Mar	Apr	May	Jun	Jul	Aug	Sep	Oct	Nov	Dec	Year
Record high °C (°F)	16.8 (62.2)	21.1 (70.0)	27.5 (81.5)	29.8 (85.6)	32.0 (89.6)	37.5 (99.5)	40.5 (104.9)	41.1 (106.0)	36.4 (97.5)	29.4 (84.9)	23.4 (74.1)	18.6 (65.5)	41.1 (106.0)
Mean daily maximum °C (°F)	7.2 (45.0)	8.9 (48.0)	13.0 (55.4)	16.2 (61.2)	20.5 (68.9)	23.7 (74.7)	26.5 (79.7)	26.5 (79.7)	21.7 (71.1)	17.0 (62.6)	10.8 (51.4)	7.2 (45.0)	16.6 (61.9)
Daily mean °C (°F)	4.1 (39.4)	4.9 (40.8)	8.0 (46.4)	10.5 (50.9)	14.7 (58.5)	17.7 (63.9)	20.0 (68.0)	20.0 (68.0)	15.9 (60.6)	12.4 (54.3)	7.4 (45.3)	4.3 (39.7)	11.7 (53.1)
Mean daily minimum °C (°F)	1.0 (33.8)	0.9 (33.6)	3.0 (37.4)	4.9 (40.8)	8.8 (47.8)	11.7 (53.1)	13.5 (56.3)	13.4 (56.1)	10.1 (50.2)	7.8 (46.0)	4.1 (39.4)	1.4 (34.5)	6.7 (44.1)
Record low °C (°F)	−16.8 (1.8)	−14.7 (5.5)	−13.1 (8.4)	−5.4 (22.3)	−0.6 (30.9)	1.6 (34.9)	5.9 (42.6)	4.5 (40.1)	0.9 (33.6)	−4.4 (24.1)	−10.0 (14.0)	−12.0 (10.4)	−16.8 (1.8)
Average precipitation mm (inches)	57.0 (2.24)	48.9 (1.93)	50.0 (1.97)	51.9 (2.04)	63.5 (2.50)	52.3 (2.06)	49.3 (1.94)	53.5 (2.11)	61.1 (2.41)	69.3 (2.73)	59.5 (2.34)	63.0 (2.48)	679.3 (26.74)
Average precipitation days (≥ 1.0 mm)	11.3	10.2	11.1	9.6	10.3	9.1	8.0	7.6	8.4	10.5	10.6	11.9	118.7
Source: Meteociel

== See also ==
- Communes of the Yonne department
- Joigny coach crash
