= Joigny coach crash =

1990 crash in Yonne, France

Details
- Date: 3 June 1990; 08:00
- Location: Joigny
- Country: France
- Operator: Pineda Holidays
- Owner: Montego European Travel
- Incident type: Single-vehicle crash
- Cause: Blowout caused by excessive speed

Statistics
- Passengers: 69
- Deaths: 12
- Injured: 61

The Joigny coach crash was a single-vehicle accident that occurred on the A6 autoroute in Joigny, Yonne, France, on 3 June 1990, when a British-registered double-decker coach crashed. In an attempt to make up for lost time, it was travelling in excess of 78 miles per hour (126 km/h) when a tyre blew out and it crashed, killing 12 passengers. The subsequent court case was subjected to a 13-year delay, becoming one of the lengthiest legal cases in France.

== Accident ==
Montego European Travel, based in Wetley Rocks, Staffordshire, began business with two coaches in April 1990. They were hired by Telford-based Pineda Holidays. One of its vehicles, a 1983 Van Hool Astromega 76-seat double-decker coach – containing sixty-nine passengers from the West Midlands or Liverpool between the ages of 9 and 76; six guides; and a driver – was on a return trip to Birmingham from Nîmes with sources stating that it was making its return from Costa Brava, Spain. The coach had passed an inspection in July 1989 and was due for another the following July.

Whilst travelling along the main north–south portion of the A6 autoroute, 80 miles (130 km) south of Paris at 8:00 am, the coach's front driver's side tyre suffered a blowout at 78 miles per hour (126 km/h), 20 miles per hour (32 km/h) over the legal speed limit, as the driver attempted to make up for lost time. The coach crashed into a ditch, flipped over to its side, and slid more than 300 feet (91 m) before going through concrete fence posts and stopping in a wheat field. It took four hours to extract passengers trapped in the wreckage. Just prior to the accident, passengers voiced their concern at the coach's excessive speed and erratic movement to a courier, but were ignored.

== Casualties ==
Eleven passengers were killed and 61 injured, 33 of whom were hospitalised overnight. Of those who died, six passengers were from Telford, Shropshire, and five from the West Midlands – one from Oldbury, the rest from Wolverhampton. A majority of them were sitting in the front of the bus. The victims were between the ages of 10 and 68. The driver, John Johnston from Stoke-on-Trent, was seriously injured but survived. A news article in the Evening Standard claimed that he had been driving for the company for ten days and had been licensed to drive this type of vehicle for over two years. One of the dead, an 18-year-old woman, was 17 weeks pregnant. The tyres were later found to be under-inflated but in good condition.

At that time, it was compulsory for all buses built after 1988 to be equipped with speed limiters. Those built between 1984 and 1988 were required to have limiters by 1 April 1990; those built between 1974 and 1983 by 1 April 1991. Coaches were not required to have seat belts; at the time their use was opposed by a majority of the European Union.

The accident was the worst road accident in France since a 1982 crash when 53 people, including 44 children, died when their bus caught fire following a pile-up near Beaune.

== Legal proceedings ==
Manslaughter charges were initially brought against John Johnston, the driver of the bus; Melvin Eardley, the owner of Montego European Travel; and Anthony Mitchard, chief executive of Avon Rubber, which manufactured the tyres. The charges against Mitchard and Eardley were dropped in 2001 and 2002, respectively.

After arguments about blame and various legal errors, Johnston was tried in Sens in 2003, thirteen years after the accident. Although the prosecutor acknowledged that the delay was "scandalous" and stated that the families of accident victims could seek damages from the French government, the presiding judge rejected defence arguments that the case should be dismissed. Johnston was found guilty of involuntary manslaughter and received a suspended sentence of 30 months in prison and a five-year driving ban. Following the rejection of Johnston's appeals in the French courts, a British inquest ruled the case an accidental death in October 2006. Johnston had died of natural causes the previous August at the age of 68.

== See also ==
- List of road accidents
