= Moment of Truth =

Moment of Truth or The Moment of Truth may refer to:

== Music ==
=== Album ===
- Moment of Truth (Gerald Wilson album), 1962
- Moment of Truth (Terri Nunn album), 1991
- Moment of Truth, a 2004 album by Da' T.R.U.T.H.
- The Moment of Truth (compilation album), a 1999 album in The Emo Diaries series
- Moment of Truth (ELO Part II album), 1994
- Moment of Truth (Gang Starr album), 1998, or its title track
- The Moment of Truth (The Real Milli Vanilli album), 1990
- Moment of Truth (Suzy Bogguss album), 1990
- Moment of Truth (Man with No Name album), 1996
- Moment of Truth, a 2013 album by Glenn Lewis
- Moment of Truth (Tinsley Ellis album), 2007
- The Moment of Truth (Crow Mother album), 2017

=== Songs ===
- "The Moment of Truth" (Survivor song), 1984, part of the soundtrack for The Karate Kid
- "Moment of Truth", a 2018 song by Cyn from the Smallfoot film soundtrack
- "Moment of Truth", a 2004 song by Damageplan from New Found Power
- "Moment of Truth", a 1971 song by Earth, Wind & Fire from Earth, Wind & Fire
- "Moment of Truth", a 2006 song by FM Static from Critically Ashamed
- "Moment of Truth", a 1993 song by Jeff Watson from Around the Sun
- "Moment of Truth", a 2023 song by Lil Durk from Almost Healed
- "Moment of Truth", a 2001 song by Timothy B. Schmit from Feed the Fire
- ”Moment of Truth”, a 1987 song by Whitney Houston, the B-side to "I Wanna Dance with Somebody (Who Loves Me)"

== Film ==
- The Moment of Truth (1952 film), a French film
- The Moment of Truth (1965 film), an Italian film
- In August of 1944, or The Moment of Truth, a 2001 Russian-Belarusian action film
- Moment of Truth (film series), a series of made-for-television movies from the Lifetime cable channel

== Television ==
- Moment of Truth (Canadian TV series), a Canadian serial drama television series which aired on CBC Television from 1964 to 1969
- Moment of Truth (2021 TV series), an American true crime documentary about the unsolved murder of James R. Jordan Sr. in 1993.
- The Moment of Truth (American game show), an American game show
- The Moment of Truth (British game show), a British game show
- Sach Ka Saamna, an Indian game show based on The Moment of Truth
- "Moment of Truth" (Luke Cage), an episode of Luke Cage
- "The Moment of Truth" (Merlin), an episode of Merlin

== Other ==
- Moment of truth (marketing), when a customer interacts with a product that changes an impression about that particular product
- The Moment of Truth (novel), a 2003 novel based on the Star Wars franchise
- The Moment of Truth (play), a 1951 satire comedy drama play by Peter Ustinov

== See also ==
- Epiphany (disambiguation)
