= Peter LaMotte =

American physician (1929–2007)

Peter LaMotte (1929–2007) was a physician. LaMotte served as the first team physician of the New York Mets baseball team from their founding until 1974. He also founded Hilton Head Hospital on Hilton Head Island, South Carolina.

== Early life and education ==
LaMotte was born to Louis LaMotte, Jr. and Lois LaMotte in Manhattan in 1929. During his childhood, he contracted polio. LaMotte later raced Stearman model 75 biplanes as a teenager. After graduating from the Landon School in Bethesda, Maryland, he earned his bachelor's degree at Trinity College in Hartford, Connecticut.

LaMotte earned his medical degree from George Washington University Medical School in Washington, D.C. He then completed a medical residency and internship at Roosevelt Hospital and orthopedic training at Columbia Presbyterian Hospital in Manhattan. Following his training, LaMotte returned to work at Roosevelt Hospital. He rose to the positions of chief of trauma surgery and chief of orthopedic surgery during his time there.
