= Motemei =

South American food

Motemei (from Spanish, moteméi) is a South American food made from shelled, cooked and peeled maize that is prepared as a dessert, stew or refreshment. The term in Spanish "moteméi" comes from the contraction of the words "mote" (in gastronomy, the generic name for various cereals or legumes cooked in water) and "maíz" (maize).

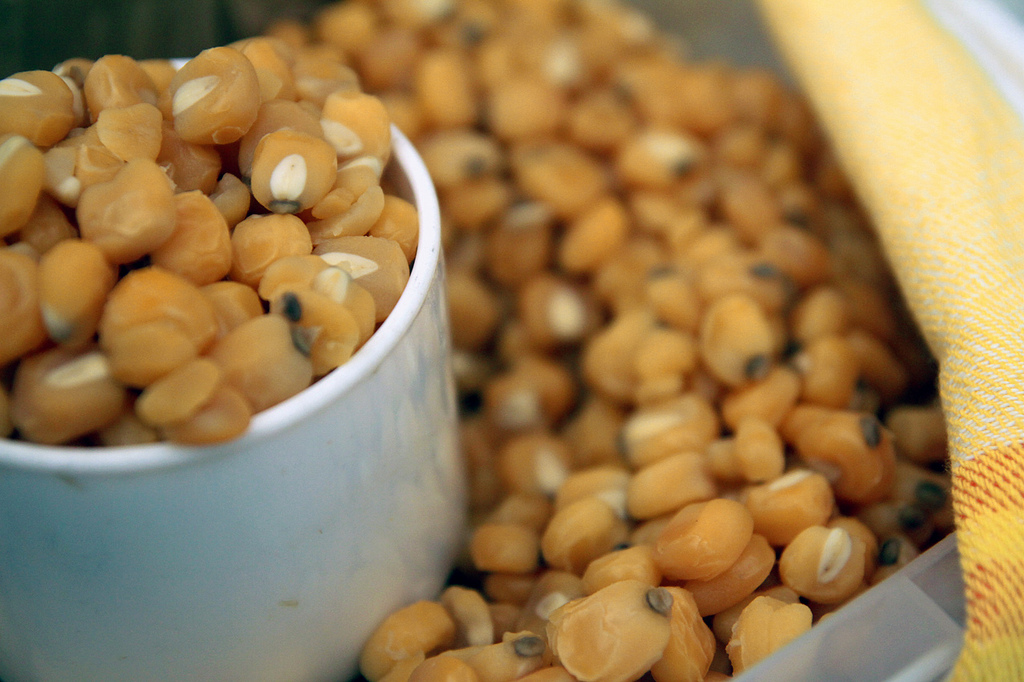
Motemei.
