= Lamotte (surname) =

Lamotte is a surname, and may refer to:

- Bernard Lamotte (1903–1983), French painter
- Étienne Lamotte (1903–1983), Belgian priest and academic
- Fabian Lamotte (born 1983), German footballer
- Gaston Lamotte (1886–1964), French sprinter
- Mado Lamotte, Canadian drag queen
- Martin Lamotte (born 1947), French actor, comedian and director

== See also ==
- LaMotte (surname)
- Motte (surname)
