= Motte v Faulkner =

1735 lawsuit between Benjamin Motte and George Faulkner

Motte v Faulkner (decided 28 November 1735) was a copyright lawsuit between Benjamin Motte and George Faulkner over who had the legal rights to publish the works of Jonathan Swift in London. This trial was one of the first to test the Statute of Anne copyright law in regards to Irish publishing independence. Although neither held the copyright to all of Swift's works, the suit became a legal struggle over Irish rights, which were eventually denied by the English courts. Faulkner, in 1735, published the Works of Jonathan Swift in Dublin. However, a few of the works were under Motte's copyright within the Kingdom of Great Britain, and when Faulkner sought to sell his book in London, Motte issued a formal complaint to Jonathan Swift and then proceeded to sue Faulkner. An injunction was issued in Motte's favor, and the book was prohibited from being sold on British soil. The basis of the law protected the rights of the author, and not the publisher, of the works, and Swift was unwilling to support a lawsuit against Faulkner. With Swift's reaction used as a basis, the lawsuit was later seen as a struggle between the rights of Irishmen to print material that were denied under English law.

== Background ==
=== Benjamin Motte ===
Motte was a London publisher who took over Benjamin Tooke's publishing business, which printed many of Swift's earlier works. In 1726, Swift sent Motte a copy of Gulliver's Travels to be printed anonymously. Motte took great care to protect the identity of the author, and employed five publishing houses to speed production of the book and avoid unlicensed copying. In 1727, Motte formed his first direct contract with Swift in order to publish Swift's Miscellanies. As part of the contract, Motte paid Tooke for the original copyright to the work.

=== George Faulkner ===
Faulkner's Dublin Journal, a newspaper established in 1725, featured many articles written by Swift or inspired by writings of Swift. Between 1727 and 1730, Faulkner published many works attributed to Swift, but many were actually written by others. After 1730, only one of those works printed by Faulkner under Swift's name turned out to be written by someone besides Swift, which suggests to some critics that Swift was working with Faulkner to ensure that only authentic works were printed under Swift's name. He was the first to publish The Answer to the Craftsman, Swift's final defense of the Irish economy from England's policies. Faulkner was also the first to publish the collected Drapier's Letters as Fraud Detected on 2 October 1725. Faulkner also helped edit An Epistle upon an Epistle around December 1729.

== The case ==
On 14 August 1725, Swift wrote to Charles Ford that his work, Gulliver's Travels, was finished, however, he soon added a scene referring to the Drapier's Letters. Swift wrote, in a letter to Pope, "a printer shall be found brave enough to venture his ears". The printer Swift found was Benjamin Motte, and Swift did not control the publication in order to, as some critics say, preserve his anonymity.

Although Swift found Motte willing to print the work, he was not willing to print Swift's additional scene. Swift's lack of control over the publication lead to Swift complaining of "mangled and murdered Pages". This was one of many reasons that Swift turned from Motte as his printer and sought a printer willing to produce his complete works without content removal. On 9 October 1733, Swift wrote:

Now, you may please to remember how much I complained of Motts suffering some friend of his (I suppose it was Mr Took a Clergy-man now dead) not onely to blot out some things that he thought might give offence, but to insert a good deal of trash contrary to the Author's manner and Style, and Intention.

— Swift 1910, to Ford, 9 October 1733

Three editions of Gulliver's Travels were produced in London during 1726 and a "corrected" edition of Motte's works were printed by John Hyde in Dublin. Although Herbert Davis thought that the Hyde edition would not please Swift, some critics argue that Swift involved himself in helping Hyde make some corrections to the edition that was based on Motte's London edition. The next year, Risk, Ewing, and Smith printed in Dublin a simple reprint of Motte's original print with minor corrections. Motte then produced his "second edition" (his fourth version) of Gulliver's Travels in 1727 with many corrections. Many of the corrections of Motte's later editions were based on Swift's corrections sent to the printer via letters.

The edition published by Faulkner includes over 500 corrections to the original text, surpassing any other editions. Faulkner's version also contains over 50 passages that either not present in the original or expanded on from the original text. This has suggested to some critics that the Faulkner edition was a later rework of Gulliver's Travels and not just a correction to printing related mistakes. The inclusion of these many additions was later seen by critics as part of Swift's disapproval of Motte's versions, but others see Motte's version as being more true to the anti-government spirit of Swift's work, which confuses Swift's motivation in allowing Faulkner to reprint the work.

Swift's other works were previous collected in a four-volume set edited by Alexander Pope called Miscellanies, but Swift wanted to have a "proper" edition of his works. Some critics speculate that Swift turned to having his work printed without public sponsorship because he was afraid of breaking his commitments to Pope and his publisher Motte. Regardless of what Swift may or may not be planning, he wrote to Motte in December 1732 and said: "I have cause to believe that some of our printers will collected all they think to be mine, and print them by subscription, which I will never encourage nor oppose."

On 9 February 1733, Faulkner advertised his future publication of Swift's collected works in four volumes in the Dublin Journal. However, this edition led to controversy, since the London bookseller Benjamin Motte had publication rights, under English copyright law, to many of the works included in Faulkner's edition. The English, in 1735, attempted to pass a law that would allow a copyright holder to prohibit works that may violate their copyright, but this law failed to pass through Parliament.

== The decision ==
Motte, without power to halt the introduction of Faulkner's work on his own, asked Swift to intervene, but Swift passively refused. Even without the backing of Swift, Motte turned to the English legal system to halt the introduction of Faulkner's edition. Motte issued a Bill of Complaint and sued under the Statute of Anne, claiming that Faulkner's publishing of the 1735 Works infringed on his right to publish works like Gulliver's Travels. The case was heard by the Court of Chancery, and they agreed with Motte in a ruling by Lord Talbot, the Lord High Chancellor of Great Britain. In the 28 November 1735, it was determined Motte could put forth an injunction to the whole of Swift's works. Although works like the Drapier's Letters were not under Motte's copyright and some works were printed before 1709, Faulkner's complete work was legally brought to a halt from being published in England.

== Critical response ==
It is uncertain if Swift allowed Faulkner to publish the works in order to allow an Irish publisher to compete against an English publisher or if Swift had no say in the matter and Faulkner published the works against Swift's will. In a letter to Motte in May 1736, Swift did not defend Faulkner's legal right to publish the works but made sure to admonish the attitude and action of Motte as a publisher for prosecuting Faulkner instead of coming to an agreement that Faulkner would be allowed to reprint the copyrighted material.

However, some critics believe that Swift used the incident to "enlarge the affair into another example of English oppression of the Irish." Swift wrote in a letter to Motte on 25 May 1736:

the cruel oppressions of this kingdom by England are not to be borne. You send what books you please hither, and the booksellers here can send nothing to you that is written here. As this is absolute oppression, if I were a bookseller in this town, I would use all the safe means to reprint London books, and run them to any town in England, that I could, because whoever offends not the laws of God, or the country he lives in, commits no sin.... But I am so incensed against the oppresions from England, and have so little regard to the laws they make, that I do, as a clergyman, encourage the merchants both to export wool and woollen manufactures to any country in Europe, or anywhere else, and conceal it from the Custom-house officers, as I would hide my purse from a highwayman, if he came to rob me on the road, although England hath made a law to the contrary; and so I would encourage our booksellers here to sell your author's books printed here, and send them to all the towns in England, if I could do it with safety and profit; because I repeat, it is no offence against God, or the laws of the country I live in.

There is much debate in the academic community on which printer produced the "authoritative" edition of Swift's works, especially Gulliver's Travels. Harold Williams was one of the major proponents of the Faulkner edition being "correct". However, some critics argue that the Faulkner edition was instead a "corrected" edition that added new revisions, and that neither text can truly be called authoritative.

== Influence ==
In legal terms, the report of Motte v Faulkner of 28 November 1735 is no longer in existence, but was cited in a later legal decisions on copyright issues, such as Miller v Taylor of 1769 which read: "In the case of Motte vs Falkner, 28 November, 1735 an injunction was granted for printing Pope's and Swift's Miscellanies. Many of these pieces were published in 1701, 1702, 1708; and the counsel strongly pressed the objection, as to these pieces. Lord Talbot continued the injunction, as to the whole: and it was acquiesced under. Yet Falknor, the Irish bookseller, was a man of substance; and the general point was of consequence to him: but he was not advised to litigate further."

The case Pope v Curll [1741] refers to the Irish/English aspects of publishing that came up in Motte v Faulkner. Curll claimed his reprinting of a work from a Dublin edition originally made by George Faulkner would, under the Statute of Anne, be lawfully reprinted in England. Lord Hardwicke ruled on the matter, 17 June 1741, that works first published in Ireland do not allow the publication of works in London if they invalidate the copyright.
