= François de Saint-Just =

French politician (1896–1989)

- Born: 19 March 1896; Joigny, Yonne, France
- Died: 19 October 1989 (aged 93); Joigny, Yonne, France
- Occupation: Politician

François de Saint-Just (19 March 1896 – 19 October 1989) was a French politician. He served as a member of the Chamber of Deputies from 1933 to 1942, representing Pas-de-Calais. He was a knight of the Legion of Honour.
