= Platzer Motte =

German homebuilt aircraft

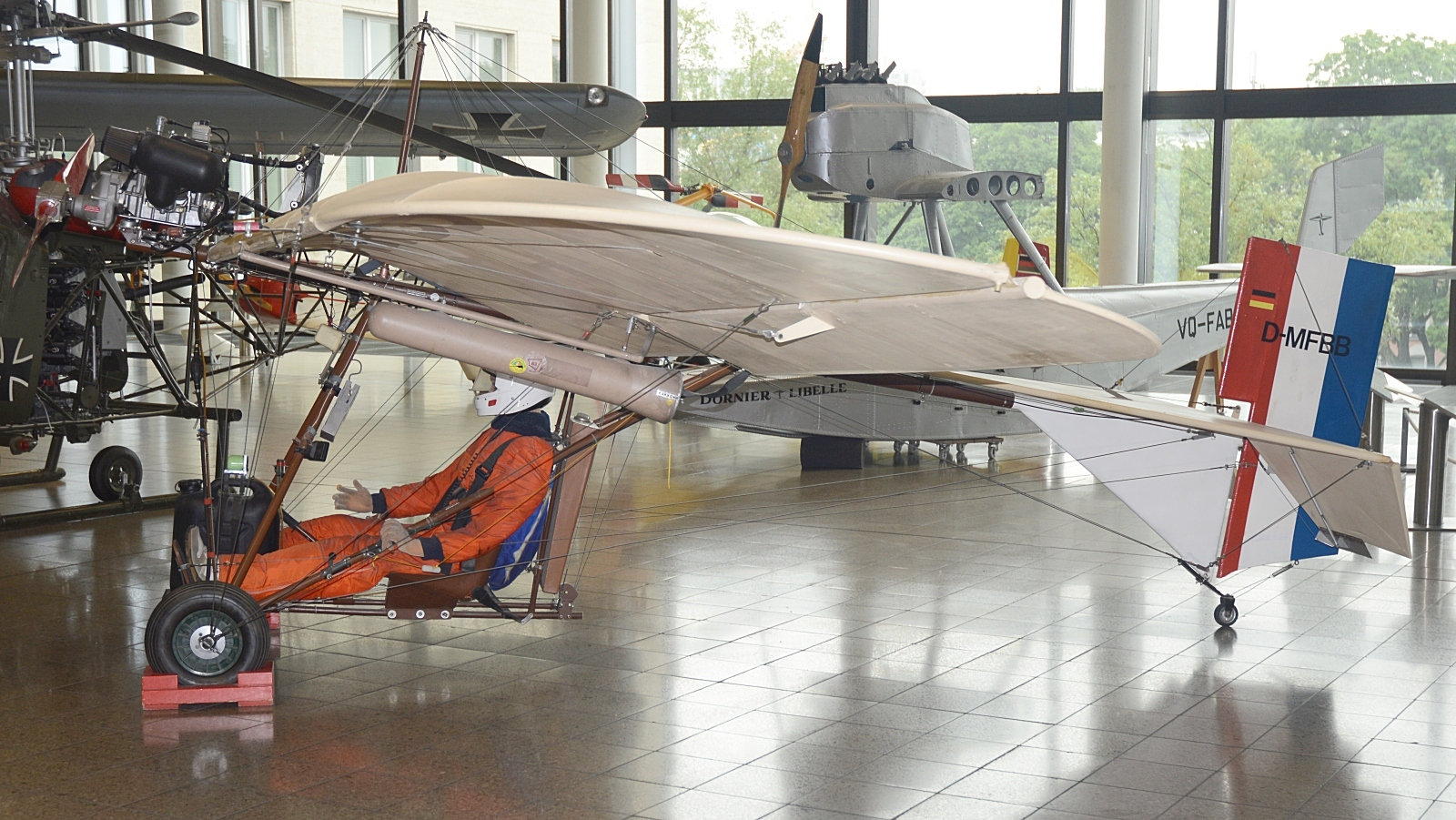

General information
- Type: Amateur-built aircraft
- National origin: Germany
- Designer: Michael Platzer
- Status: Plans available (2011)

The Platzer Motte (English: Moth) is a German amateur-built aircraft designed by Michael Platzer and made available in the form of plans for amateur construction.

== Design and development ==
The Motte features a strut-braced parasol wing configuration, single-seat open cockpit with a small windshield, fixed conventional landing gear and a single engine in tractor configuration.

The aircraft uses the same wing design as the Platzer Kiebitz biplane. The Motte's fuselage is made from metal tubing, with its flying surfaces covered in doped aircraft fabric. Its 8.2 m (26.9 ft) span wing has an area of 13 m^{2} (140 sq ft) supported by V-struts and jury struts. Engines used include the 65 hp (48 kW) Nissan 12P automotive engine from a Nissan Micra, as well as the 51 hp (38 kW) Rotax 462 powerplant.

Pilot access can be difficult due to the proximity of the wing mounted close above the cockpit. Builders have solved this with a trailing edge wing cut-out.

== Operational history ==
The Motte was Platzer's first design, but his later two-seat Kiebitz biplane has proven much more popular than the Motte with builders.

== Specifications (Motte) ==
Data from Bayerl and Tacke

General characteristics

- Crew: one
- Wingspan: 8.2 m (26 ft 11 in)
- Wing area: 13 m^{2} (140 sq ft)
- Empty weight: 180 kg (397 lb)
- Gross weight: 285 kg (628 lb)
- Fuel capacity: 35 to 60 litres (7.7 to 13.2 imp gal; 9.2 to 15.9 US gal)
- Powerplant: 1 × Rotax 462 twin cylinder, air-cooled, two stroke engine, 38 kW (51 hp)
- Propellers: two-bladed wooden

Performance

- Maximum speed: 160 km/h (99 mph, 86 kn)
- Cruise speed: 120 km/h (75 mph, 65 kn)
- Stall speed: 50 km/h (31 mph, 27 kn)
- Rate of climb: 4 m/s (790 ft/min)
- Wing loading: 21.9 kg/m^{2} (4.5 lb/sq ft)
