= Lamotte =

Lamotte, LaMotte or La Motte may refer to:

== Places ==
=== Canada ===
- La Motte, Quebec

=== France ===
- La Grande-Motte, in the Hérault département
- La Motte, Côtes-d'Armor, in the Côtes-d'Armor département
- La Motte, Var, in the Var département
- La Motte-Chalancon, in the Drôme département
- La Motte-d'Aigues, in the Vaucluse département
- La Motte-d'Aveillans, in the l'Isère département
- La Motte-de-Galaure, in the Drôme département
- La Motte-du-Caire, in the Alpes-de-Haute-Provence département
- La Motte-en-Bauges, in the Savoie département
- La Motte-en-Champsaur, in the Hautes-Alpes département
- La Motte-Fanjas, in the Drôme département
- La Motte-Feuilly, in the Indre département
- La Motte-Fouquet, in the Orne département
- La Motte-Saint-Jean, in the Saône-et-Loire département
- La Motte-Saint-Martin, in the Isère département
- La Motte-Servolex, in the Savoie département
- La Motte-Ternant, in the Côte-d'Or département
- La Motte-Tilly, in the Aube département
- Lamotte-Beuvron, in the Loir-et-Cher département
- Lamotte-Brebière, in the Somme département
- Lamotte-Buleux, in the Somme département
- La Motte-de-Galaure, a commune in the Drôme department
- Lamotte-du-Rhône, in the Vaucluse département
- Lamotte-Warfusée, in the Somme département
- La Mothe-Achard, in the Vendée département
- La Mothe-en-Bassigny, a destroyed city and citadel in the Haute-Marne département
- La Mothe-Saint-Héray, in the Deux-Sèvres département
- Lamothe, Haute-Loire, in the Haute-Loire département
- Lamothe, Landes, in the Landes département
- Lamothe-Capdeville, in the Tarn-et-Garonne département
- Lamothe-Cassel, in the Lot département
- Lamothe-Cumont, in the Tarn-et-Garonne département
- Lamothe-en-Blaisy, in the Haute-Marne département
- Lamothe-Fénelon, in the Lot département
- Lamothe-Goas, in the Gers département
- Lamothe-Landerron, in the Gironde département
- Lamothe-Montravel, in the Dordogne département
- Saint-Jean-de-la-Motte, a commune in the Sarthe department in the region of Pays-de-la-Loire
- a lieu-dit in Ledringhem, in the Nord département

=== United States ===
- La Motte, Iowa, a city
- LaMotte, Missouri, a ghost town
- Lamotte Township, Crawford County, Illinois
- Lamotte Township, Michigan

== Other ==
- LaMotte (surname)
- Lamotte-Picquet (D 645), French anti-submarine frigate
- French ship La Motte-Picquet, the name of three other ships of the French Navy

== See also ==
- Motte
- Lamotte-Picquet (disambiguation)
