= Rotax 462 =

Austrian two-stroke aircraft engine

- Type: Piston aero-engine
- National origin: Austria
- Manufacturer: Rotax

The Rotax 462 is a 51 hp (38 kW), two-cylinder, two-stroke aircraft engine, derived from a snowmobile engine. It was built by Rotax of Austria for use in ultralight aircraft.

== Applications ==
- Guerpont Autoplum
- Huntwing 462LC
- Platzer Motte
- Sky-Walker 1+1

== Specifications (462) ==
Data from ROTAX Repair Manual for engine type 462 - 532 - 582 UL

=== General characteristics ===
- Type: Two-cycle, two-cylinder rotary valve engine, oil-in-fuel

lubrication, liquid-cooled, with integrated water pump

- Bore: 69.5 mm (2.74 in)
- Stroke: 61 mm (2.401 in)
- Displacement: 462.8 cc (28.242 cu in)
- Dry weight: 32 kg (70.5 lb) (dry, no exhaust system)

=== Components ===
- Valvetrain: Rotary valve
- Oil system: oil-in-fuel lubrication
- Cooling system: liquid
- Reduction gear: 2.0 / 2.24 / 2.58 / 3.0

=== Performance ===
- Power output: 38 kW (51 hp) at 6500 rpm (standard version), 28 kW (38 hp) at 5500 rpm (low performance version)
- Compression ratio: theoretical: 11.5, effective: 6.7

== See also ==
Related lists

- List of aircraft engines
