= Motte (disambiguation) =

Motte-and-bailey is a type of construction used in castles.

Motte may also refer to:

- La Motte (disambiguation), various places with this name
- Motte (film), a Malayalam film
- Motte (surname), various people with this name
- Platzer Motte, a German parasol-wing aircraft design

== See also ==
- Lamotte (disambiguation)
- Mote (disambiguation)
- Mott (disambiguation)
- Motte-and-bailey fallacy
