= LaMotte, Missouri =

Unincorporated community in Missouri, United States

Coordinates: 39°33′38″N 91°10′47″W

LaMotte is a ghost town in Pike County, in the U.S. state of Missouri. The GNIS classifies it as a populated place.

The community was named after an official at a local powdermill.
