= Mot (magazine) =

German automotive magazine

mot was a German automotive magazine that was published from 1960 until 2006 by Motor Presse Stuttgart. It was a monthly magazine until 1963, thereafter it was released fortnightly. Right before the discontinuation it appeared monthly again.

The origins of the magazine lie with Rollerei und Mobil: Roller, Mobile, Kleinwagen und Mopeds. From 2005 until 2006 the magazine was renamed Motors.

Other than its sister publication Auto motor und sport, mot emphasized the efficiency of tested vehicles. Apart from that, motorsport played only a secondary role.
