= Edme Joachim Bourdois de La Motte =

Edme-Joachim Bourdois de La Motte (14 September 1754 – 7 December 1835) was a French medical doctor.

== Biography ==
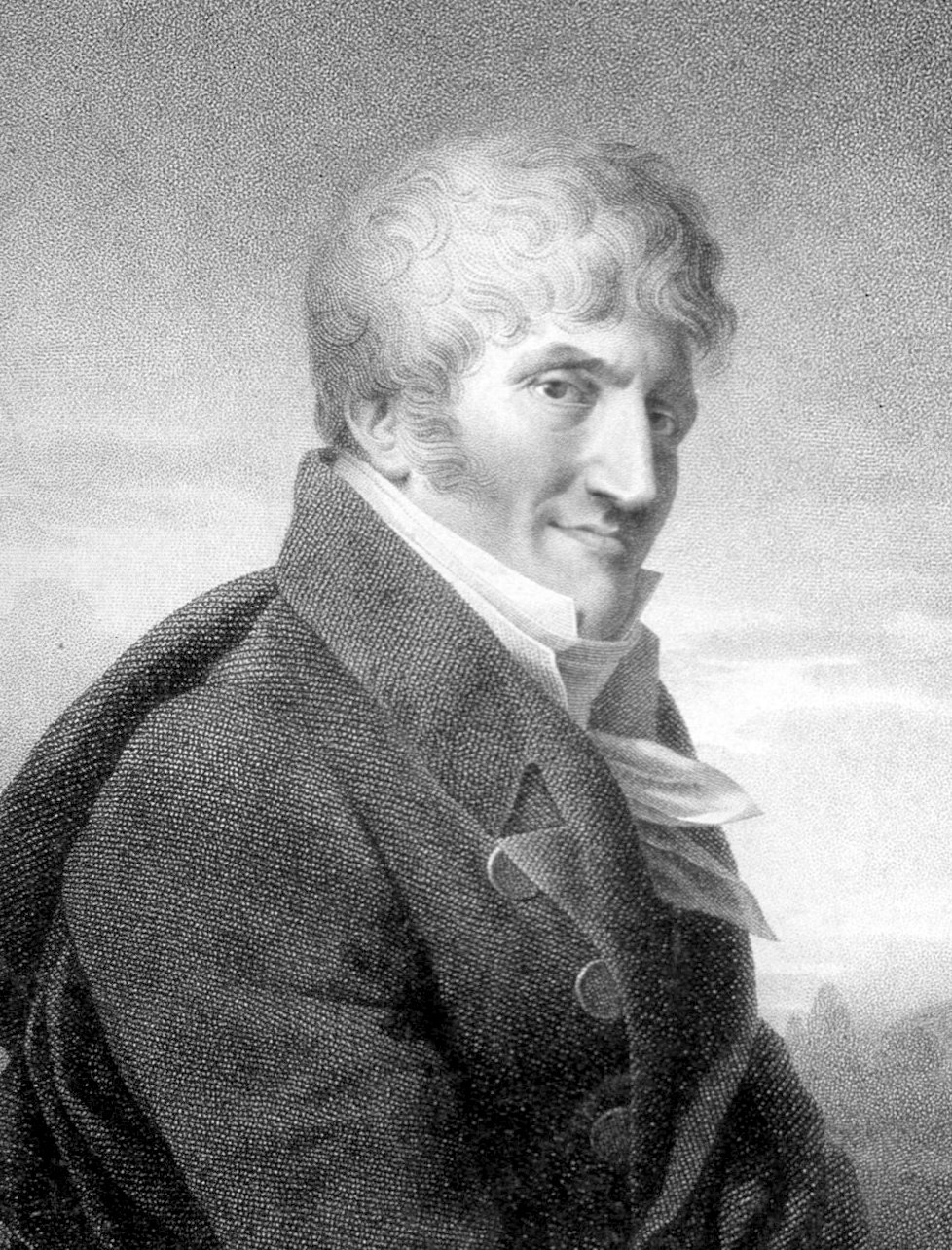
Edme-Joachim Bourdois de La Motte

Edme-Joachim Bourdois de La Motte was born at Joigny, Burgundy, the son of a famous doctor. He studies at the College of Auxerre then goes to Paris in order to do his medical education. He defends his thesis in 1777-1778 and becomes doctor at the age of 24. He begins his career in 1778 at the hospital of Charity. The next year, he becomes doctor of the Count of Provence.

Suspected in 1793, he is jailed but soon released thanks to his wife and to his friend the surgeon Dubois. In 1794, he is chief medical officer of the army of the Alps where he has to face an epidemic of Typhus. When he returns to Paris, he narrowly misses to be arrested by the Directory. This time, he owes his freedom to Talleyrand.

He meets Napoleon Bonaparte during this period and the two men become friends. But their relation falls back when Bourdois refuses to participate in the Campaign of Italy. They will not meet again before 1811.

During these years, Bourdois faces some epidemics and goes on an academic career.

In 1811, Napoleon gives him the charge of the first physician to the King of Rome, with the recommendation of Corvisart, an old friend of Bourdois from medical school. Soon after, in 1812, Bourdois is made baron.

In 1820, he becomes an early member of the Royal Academy of Medecine, which he chairs in 1822, 1823 and 1829.

Bourdois died on 7 December 1835 at the age of 81, just after having completed a report on Corvisart and his titles for the Academy.
