= Benjamin Motte =

English publisher

Benjamin Motte (/mɒt/; November 1693 – 12 March 1738) was a London publisher and son of Benjamin Motte, Sr. Motte published many works and is well known for his publishing of Jonathan Swift's Gulliver's Travels.

== Background ==
Benjamin Motte was born in the parish of St Botolph (Aldersgate), London to Benjamin Motte Sr. and Anne Clarke. He was born in early November 1693 and baptised soon after on 14 November. Some of his first mentions are of his early publications and when he took over Benjamin Tooke's publishing business.

It was not under 7 February 1715 that Motte was free from his publishing patrimony, and he took off as a bookseller in 1719. Motte's place of business in Fleet Street (London) was located in Middle Temple Gate. This space was passed to Motte by his predecessor, Benjamin Tooke, and then passed to Motte's replacement, Charles Bathurst, in 1738 upon his death. Motte was then asked to become partners with the Tooke publishing firm after Benjamin Tooke's brother, Samuel Tooke, died in December 1724, and as he took the position, he became the only active member of the publishing firm. On 21 December 1725, Motte married Elizabeth, the daughter of Rev. Thomas Brian, and had two children.

Throughout his career, Motte had three apprentices: George Hall, Thomas Isborne, and Jonathan Russell. After taking over the Tooke publishing firm, he partnered with his brother, Charles, until 1731. Although he had no partner from 1731–1734, Motte took up his apprentice, Charles Bathurst, as his apprentice.

In 1726, Jonathan Swift sent Motte a copy of Gulliver's Travels, to be printed anonymously. Motte took great care to protect the identity of the author and employed five publishing houses to speed production of the book and avoid pirating. In 1727, Motte formed his first direct contract with Swift and Alexander Pope to publish their Miscellanies. As part of the contract, Motte paid Tooke for the original copyright to the work. Motte's work with Jonathan Swift was complicated and risky; one, An Epistle to a Lady, brought about Motte's arrest in 1734.

Edmund Curll, as was his habit, claimed that he had the rights to some of Swift's miscellanies. Curll had obtained the works illegitimately and had published them to spite Swift, and he used the controversy with Motte to attempt to generate publicity. Although Curll was unwilling to do anything about the reproduction, Pope turned from Motte as his publisher for a fourth edition of the Miscellanies over a payment dispute and other publication-related complaints. Pope finally bought out his contract with Motte for twenty-five pounds.

Near the end of his life, in 1735, Motte sued the printer George Faulkner of Dublin over Faulkner's importing into Britain of Swift's Works. In Motte v. Faulkner, Motte claimed that many of the works reproduced were under copyright held by Motte from the purchase of the original copyright for many of Swift's writings from Tooke and from a contract directly with Swift to publish Gulliver's Travels. The London courts upheld Motte's claim and ordered that Faulkner's edition of Swift's Works to be kept from importation into England.

== Publications ==
Although Motte is most known for his production of Jonathan Swift's Gulliver's Travels, he produced other great works. Many of these works were published on his own, but he did work with many other printers including Samuel Ballard, Charles Bathurst, Bernard Lintot, William Mears, James Round, George Strahan, and Jacob Tonson.

English Works published by Motte:

- Eustace Budgell's Works
- Samuel Butler's Hudibras
- William Chillingworth's Works
- William Giffard's Cases in midwifry (1734)
- Alexander Pope's "Verses on Gulliver"
- Hans Sloane – A Voyage to the Islands of Madera, Barbados, Nieves, S. Christophers and Jamaica
- Jonathan Swift's Travels into Several Remote Nations of the World
- Jonathan Swift and Alexander Pope's Miscellanies in Prose and Verse (1727, 1728, 1732)
- Joseph Thurston The Toilette (1730)
- John Vanbrugh's Works
- William Wycherley's Country Wife (1731)

Works published by Motte and other publishers:

- Abraham Cowley Works translation – Mears and Strahan
- John Dryden's Don Sebastian – Strahan
- George Farquhar's Comedies Lintot and Strahan
- Thomas Otway's Venice Preserv'd – Strahan
- Thomas Otway's Works – Lintot, Strahan, and Tonson
- J. Saunders Saunders The compleat fisherman (1724) – Mears and S. Tooke
- Jonathan Swift's A Complete Collection of Genteel and Ingenious Conversation (1738) – Bathurst
- William Willymott's English examples to Lily's grammar-rules, for children's Latin exercises (1727) – Round

English translations published by Motte:

- Demosthenes's Works
- Euclid's Elements
- Eutropius's Works
- Isaac Newton's Philosophiae Naturalis Principia Mathematica (as The Mathematical Principles of Natural Philosophy..., 1729)
- Andrea Pozzo's Rules and Examples of Perspective Proper for Painters and Architects (1707)
- Terence Works
- Jacques Auguste de Thou's Works
- Gerhard Johann Vossius's Works

English translations published by Motte and other publishers:

- Desiderius Erasmus's Colloquia – Strahan
- Juvenal's Works – Ballard and Mears
- Samuel von Pufendorf – The Whole Duty of Man, According to the Law of Nature (1735) – trans. Andrew Tooke, R. Gosling and J. Pemberton
- Sallust's Works – Ballard
- Seneca's Epistulae morales ad Lucilium – Lintot, Strahan, and Tonson
- Thucydides's History of the Peloponnesian War – Lintot

Misc. contributions:

- Oratio Dominica "The Lords Prayer in Above a Hundred Languages, Versions, and Characters" (1713) – Motte was typographer for the various languages of the Lord's Prayer. He also wrote the preface and signed it "B. M. Typogr. Lond."
- The Royal Society's The Philosophical Transactions From the Year 1700 (Where Mr Lowthorp Ends) to the Year 1720 edited by Motte in 1721.

== Notable publications ==
The 1728 The Last Volume of Swift and Pope's Miscellanies including Pope's Peri Bathous provoked many pamphlets to be produced against the books.

Motte's edition of Isaac Newton's Principia (1729) was translated by Andrew Motte (1696–1734), his brother and a mathematician who served very briefly as the lecturer on geometry at Gresham College. This was the first English edition and the first translated edition that included the Scholium Generale found in the second Latin edition (1726). This edition was the most commonly taught version of Newton's Principia in English and was therefore considered the "authorized version". However, this edition was deemed "awkward" and "inaccurate" in some locations since it was based on the second Latin edition even when it was later revised by Florian Cajori.

Motte's edition of William Giffard's Cases in midwifry is the earliest published record of using Chamberlen forceps during childbirth.
