= Mount Hunt (Antarctica) =

Mountain in George V Land, Antarctica

Coordinates: 67°7′S 144°18′E

Mount Hunt is a dome-shaped mountain about 520 metres (1,700 ft) high, surmounting the promontory which terminates in Cape De la Motte, Antarctica. It was discovered by the Australasian Antarctic Expedition (1911–14) under Douglas Mawson, who named it for H.A. Hunt, Director of the Commonwealth Bureau of Meteorology.
