= Mote (food) =

Corn kernels boiled in lime

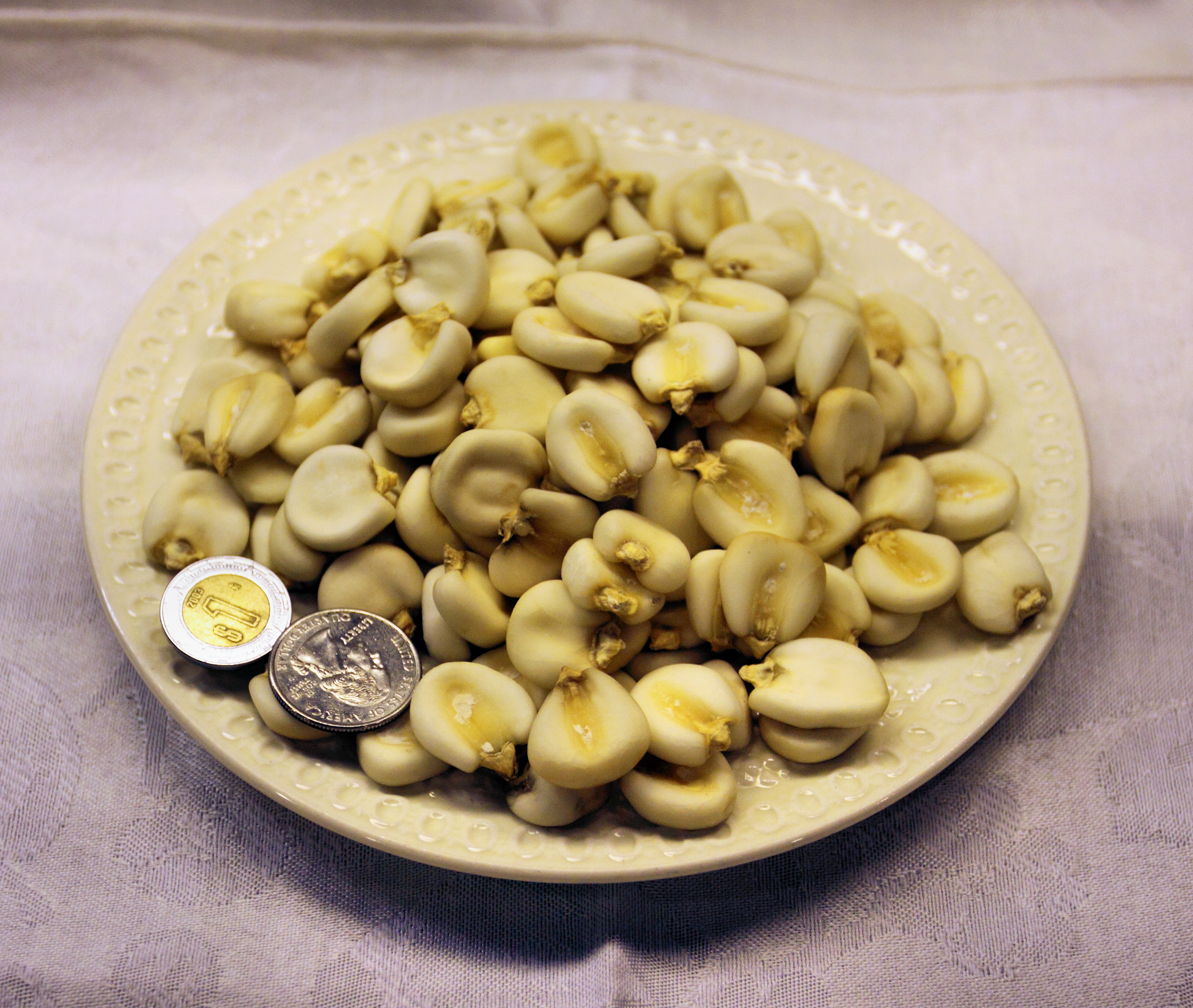
Dried maize mote, also known as hominy, is used in Mexican cuisine. (US quarter and Mexican peso at lower left.)

Mote (from Quechua: mut'i, through Spanish mote) is the generic name for several varieties of boiled grains, consumed in many regions of Latin America. It is usually prepared by boiling the grains in water made alkaline by the addition of ashes or lime, a process known as nixtamalization.

It was also a staple food for Native American hunting parties and war bands on long journeys.

== Argentina ==
In Argentina, mote is consumed primarily in the mountainous northwest region, and less frequently in Cuyo and Patagonia. It is a stew of thin consistency (this is one of the main differences with the soup called locro) made from white hominy, sometimes peeled, and boiled with jume ash. The grains are usually accompanied with small pieces of meat (llama, goat, mutton, beef, pork, poultry and more rarely viscacha and mulita). It is also made with beans and with wheat. In Patagonia, in the northern region, in addition to the stew, it is consumed accompanied with some sort of cool drink, either water, juice, tea, soft drinks, with or without the addition of sugar.

== Bolivia ==
In Bolivia "mote" refers to grain cooked in its husk. Typically, corn is used; fava beans are also used occasionally. When the husk is removed from the grain, the dish is called pelado. The term pelado used alone refers to corn. Wheat pelado is used mainly in soups.

== Chile ==
When the term "mote" is used alone, it refers to wheat mote, that is wheat grain boiled with ash and removed from its husk, generally in an industrial process. It is used mainly to make a sweet beverage called mote con huesillos. Salted, it is used to accompany stews and sauces (guisos), in dishes such as porotos con mote, mote guisado and papas con mote. It is also used in soups. In Mapuche cuisine it is used for making a type of dough called catuto in Spanish (mültrün in Mapudungun), for making a slightly alcoholic drink called muday, and as an ingredient in many foods, such as cazuelas and kakoiyael ("food of mote").

Corn mote (motemei, from mote de maíz) is a husked grain which is used in desserts and savory foods.

== Ecuador ==
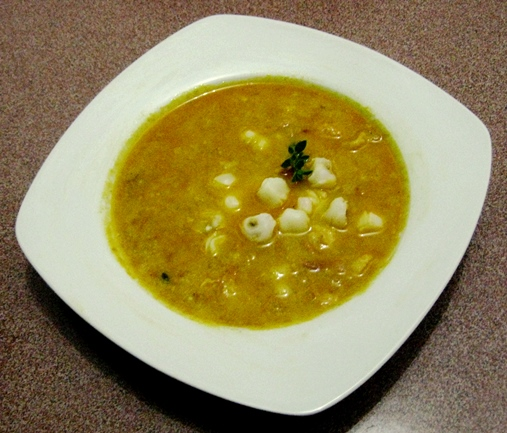
Mote pata.

In Ecuador, "mote" refers to corn kernels that have been boiled and cooked, which are served peeled. They often accompany popular dishes such as hornado and fritada. They are used in many soups, including caldo de patas. It is also the main ingredient in dishes typical of the city of Cuenca, such as mote pillo, mote sucio and mote pata.

== Peru ==
In Peru mote refers to husked white corn kernels that have been boiled with charcoal or firewood, today with calcium hydroxide (slaked lime) powder. In Cusco, Peru, there is a variety called giant corn mote of Cusco (maíz mote gigante del Cusco) that is known for its large size. In Peru, wheat cooked in the manner described above is known as wheat mote (mote del trigo).

== Venezuela ==
In Venezuela, this dish is known as mute and consists of husked white corn kernels boiled with ash or calcium hydroxide until they burst completely. In central Venezuela, pork and spices are added to the dish to provide flavor. In the Andean region, it is made with beef stomach (tripe) and in the states of Lara and Yaracuy with goat organs such as liver and kidneys. Corn prepared in this way is used for the arepa pelada from the state of Falcón.

== See also ==
- Hominy
- Wheat berry
