= Catherine R. Mott =

American inventor (1836–1880)

- Born: Catherine Rachel Saul; November 7, 1836
- Died: May 17, 1880 (aged 44)
- Resting place: Green-Wood Cemetery, Brooklyn, New York
- Occupation: Inventor

Catherine Rachel Mott (née Saul, 1836–1880) was an inventor. She received one patent in 1878 for an improved fire escape that would assure the safety of women and children escaping a fire while allowing firefighters to climb the burning structure at the same time.

== Biography ==
Catherine Saul was born on November 7, 1836, but it remains unclear where in New York she was born. She married Francis Roberts Mott who was the son of Valentine Mott a prominent surgeon in New York City. Francis worked as a clerk in the Assay office in New York. They had one daughter, Louisa Mott. Catherine died in 1880 at the age of 44 years. She is buried in Green-Wood Cemetery in Brooklyn, New York.

== Patent ==
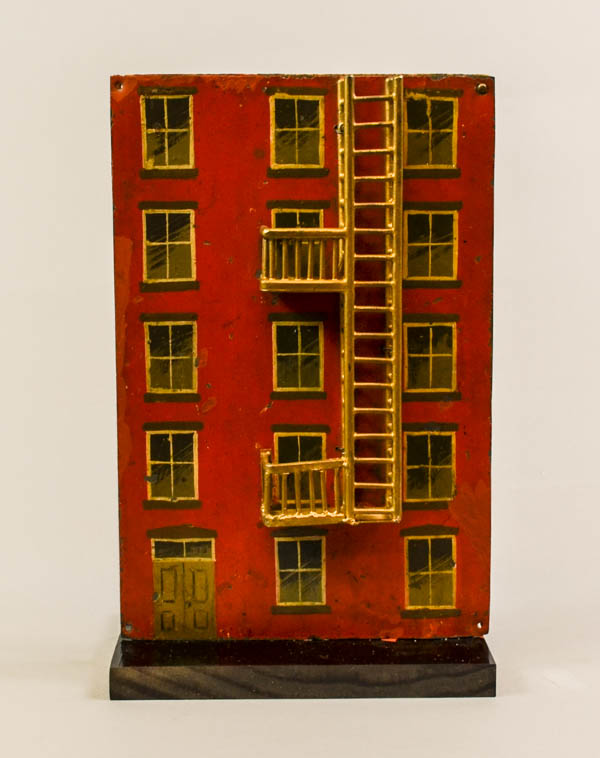
Patent Model-Improvement in Fire-Escapes, 1878, Patent Number 202,115, Hagley Museum and Library

Mott was awarded a patent in 1878 for an improved fire escape. She was concerned with the safety of women and children trying to descend a single ladder from a burning building. In this position there was the danger of their clothes, particularly women's skirts, getting caught on projecting parts of the building. There was also the added danger of the firemen trying to climb up the ladder at the same time as the residents were descending. Mott's proposal was for a cage-ladder to be permanently attached to the outside wall of the building. Using her invention, residents of the building could descend on the inside of the ladder (remaining inside the cage) while the fire fighters would ascend the outside of the ladder at the same time.

== Collections ==
- Patent Model-Improvement in Fire-Escapes, April 9, 1878, Patent Number 202,115, Hagley Museum and Library, Wilmington, Delaware
