= Benjamin Motte Sr. =

London publisher

Benjamin Motte Sr. (died December 1710) was a London publisher and father of Benjamin Motte, Andrew Motte, and Charles Motte.

== Background ==
Little is known on the exact background of Benjamin Motte Sr., but his last record as a publisher is from 1712, when he was still registered with his son, Charles, as his apprentice, although he died two years prior in St Botoloph's Parish, London. His library of works was sold the next year.

He began publishing in the 1680s and was the printer for the Parish Clerks Company from 1694 - 1709, producing such works like the Parish-Clerk's Guide. Besides being the master to his son, Motte was master to Robert Tooke, of the same Tooke family his son, Benjamin, apprenticed for.

== Publications ==
Motte's edition of Andrea Pozzo's Rules and Examples of Perspective Proper for Painters and Architects (1707) was the first edition of the work in English. It was translated by John James and illustrated by John Sturt. The work was also known as "John Sturt's 'Masterpiece'", and John Sturt's presented the work to Queen Anne as "a specimen of English engraving". James Harris claimed that the work was "the most elaborate and expensive architectural book ever produced in this country".

Other works published by Motte Sr.:

- William Hunt's Clavis Stereometriae (1691)
- Ambrosius Theodosius Macrobius's Opera Accedunt... (1707) - with Mary Clark
- Michel Maittaire's Stephanorum Historia, Vitas ipsorum ac Libros Complectens (1709)
- Samuel von Pufendorf's Works
- Samuel Wesley's The Life of Christ (1693) and Elegies (1695)
