= George William Mote =

British painter (1832–1909)

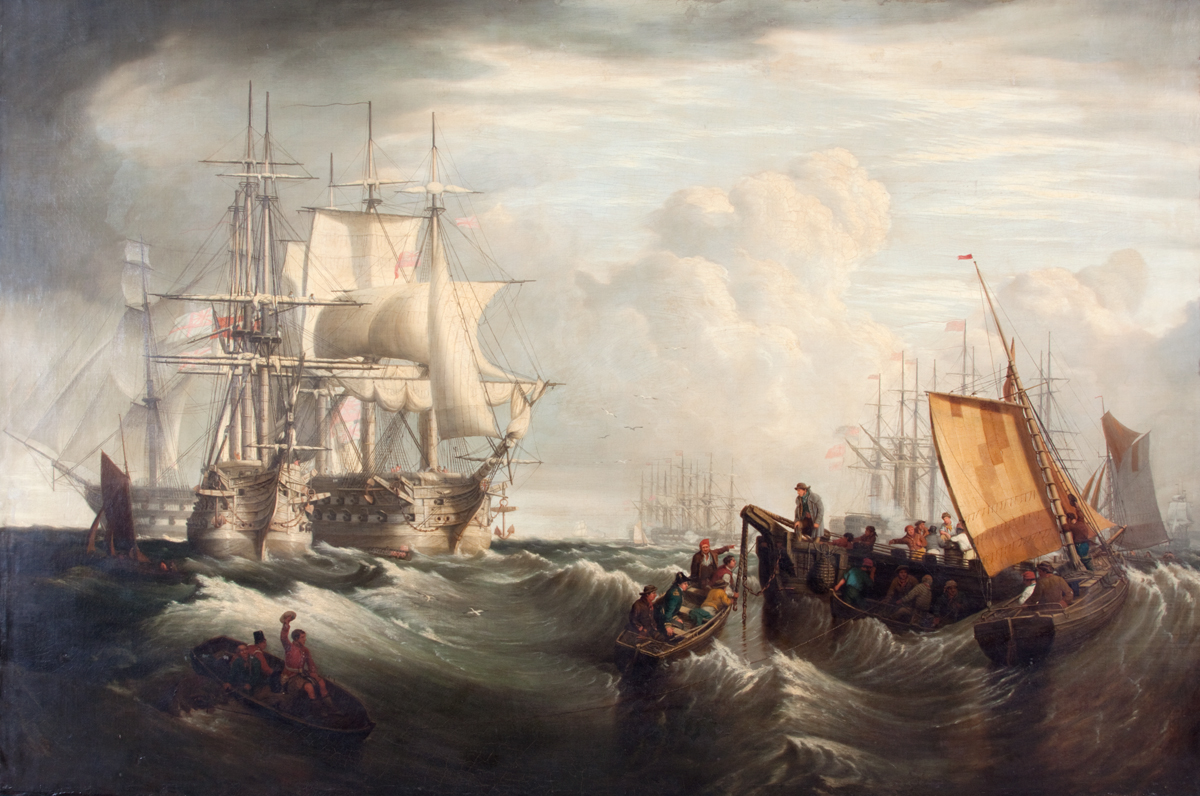
Getting up Anchor at Spithead

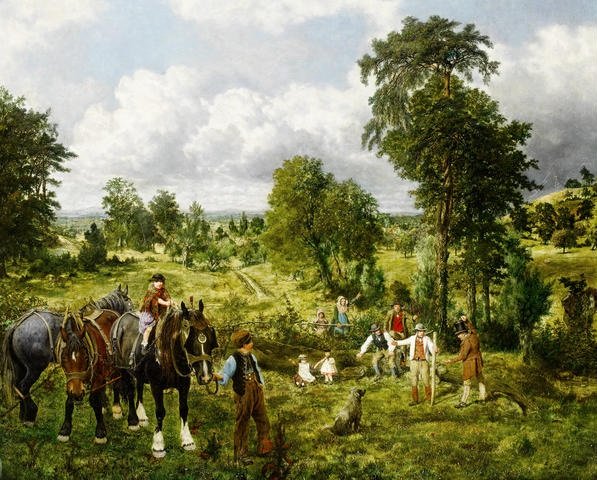
The Garden of England

George William Mote (1832–1909) was a British painter. Mote produced a series of landscape oil paintings. He started painting as the gardener/caregiver to Sir Thomas Phillips of Middle Hill. Many of Mote's paintings have been exhibited at Royal Academy and Suffolk Street Gallery of the Royal Society of British Artists.
