= Mott, Missouri =

Extinct town in the American state of Missouri

Coordinates: 36°34′31″N 91°48′19″W

Location of Mott within the state of Missouri.

Mott is an extinct town in southern Howell County, in the Ozarks of southern Missouri. The community was located on Missouri Route 17, approximately ten miles south of West Plains.

A post office called Mott was established in 1892, and remained in operation until 1911. The community was named after Martha "Aunt Mott" Briscoe, a local educator.
