= Moot =

Moot may refer to:

- Mootness, in American law: a point where further proceedings have lost practical significance; whereas in British law: the issue remains debatable
- Moot court, an activity in many law schools where participants take part in simulated court proceedings
- moot, the pseudonym for Christopher Poole (born c. 1987-88), founder of the anonymous imageboard 4chan.org
- The Moot, a discussion group of Christian intellectuals active in Britain from 1938 to 1947

== See also ==
- Meeting (Old English (Anglo-Saxon): Moot)
  - Folkmoot
  - Jamtamót, the old assembly of Jämtland
  - Witenagemot, the High Council of Anglo-Saxon England
  - Moot hall, a meeting or assembly building, traditionally to decide local issues
  - Moot hill, a hill or mound historically used as an assembly or meeting place
  - World Scout Moot, a gathering of older Scouts, mainly Rover Scouts, ages 18–26 from all over the world
  - Entmoot, a gathering of Ents in The Lord of the Rings
  - MoodleMoot, a gathering or conference relating to the Moodle Learning Management System
