= Moats, Ohio =

Unincorporated community in Ohio, U.S.

Coordinates: 41°19′54″N 84°31′33″W

Moats is an unincorporated community in Defiance County, in the U.S. state of Ohio.

A post office called Moats was established in 1889, and remained in operation until 1905. Little remains of the original community.
