= Clarence Petersen de la Motte =

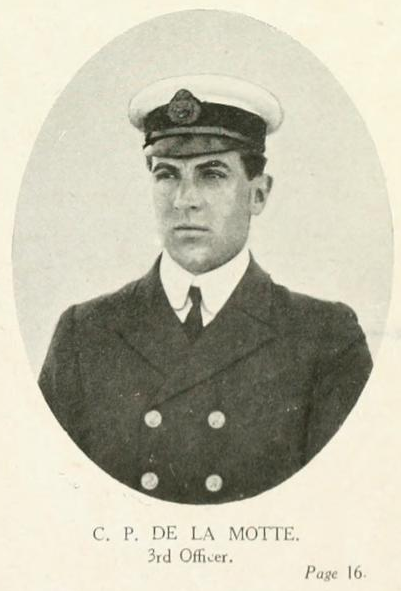
De la Motte c. 1914

Clarence Petersen de la Motte (24 February 1892 – ) was an Australian sailor originally from Bulli, New South Wales. During his early career, he served aboard the New Zealand barque Northern Chief and the steamship Warrimoo. From 1911 to 1914, during the Australasian Antarctic expedition, he served as Third Officer aboard the SY Aurora, under John King Davis.

Douglas Mawson named Cape De la Motte, in George V Land, after him. De la Motte joined the Aurora again in 1916, and served as First Officer during the rescue of the Ross Sea party of the Imperial Trans-Antarctic Expedition, for which he was later awarded the Polar Medal. On 26 February 1921, Clarence married Frances Catherine Laird (late AIF) in Adelaide.
