= Mote con huesillo =

Chilean drink

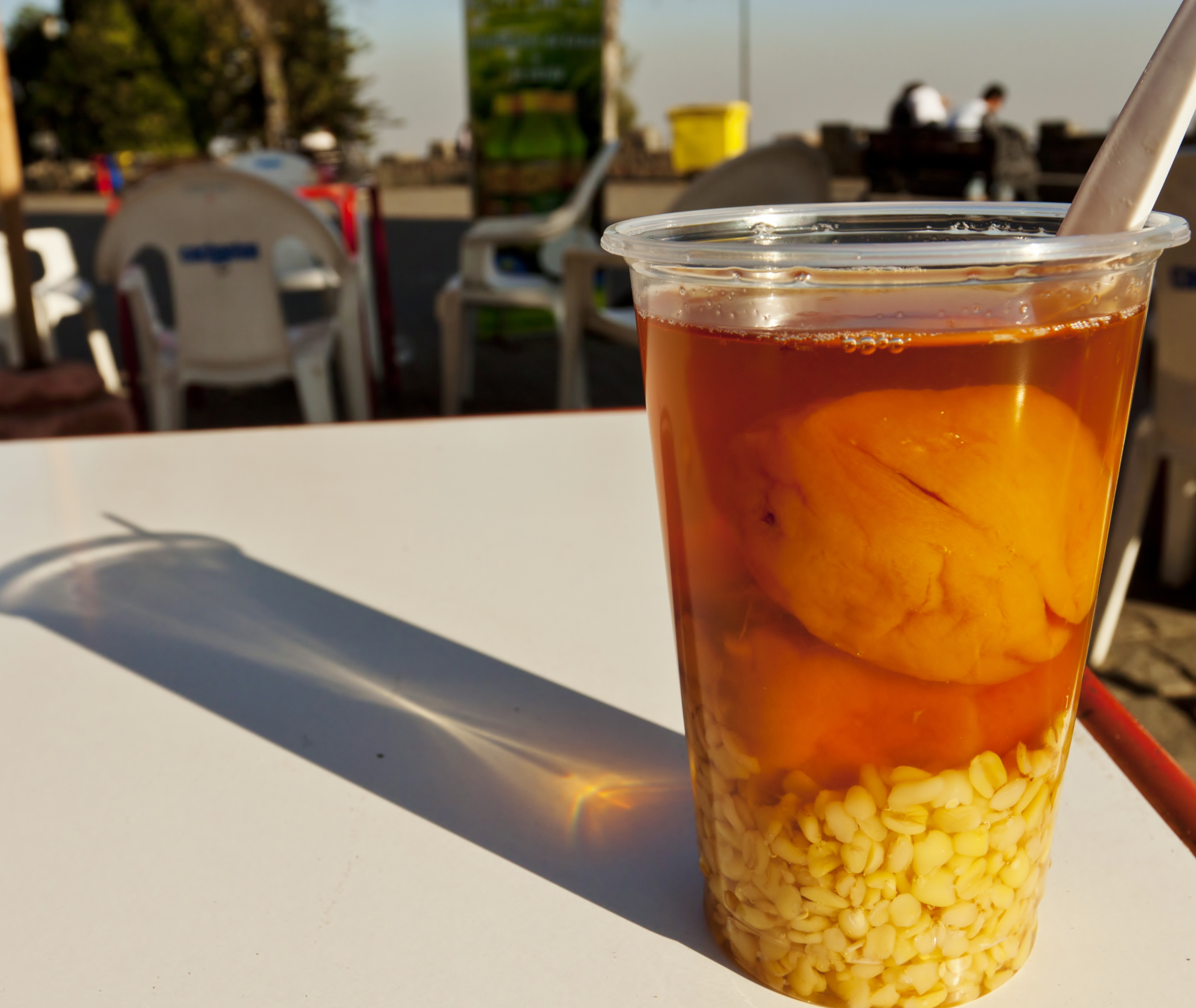
- Type: Non-alcoholic beverage
- Place of origin: Chile
- Region or state: Southern Cone
- Main ingredients: Dried peaches, sugar or honey, water, cinnamon, husked wheat
- Variations: Descarozados

Mote con huesillo is a traditional Chilean summer-time drink often sold in street stands or vendor carts. It is a non-alcoholic beverage consisting of a sweet clear nectar-like liquid made with dried peaches (huesillo) cooked in sugar, water and cinnamon, and then once cooled, mixed with fresh cooked husked wheat berries (mote). The sweet clear nectar is usually made with sugar, but can also be supplemented or replaced with molasses.

When the drink is served without the dried peaches, it is called a "descarozados". On occasion, it may also be served with dried prunes, however this is less common. Another modern option is to use peach preserves in place of the dried peaches. Both the mote and huesillo correspond to Mediterranean climates, like that of central Chile. This drink is very popular during summer months and is sold by street vendors on rolling carts or stands. It is also a very popular homemade recipe, for which the ingredients are readily available in supermarkets, small grocery stores and farmers' markets. Bottled, canned or store packaged versions of mote con huesillo are limited and thus, not common.

== Preparation ==
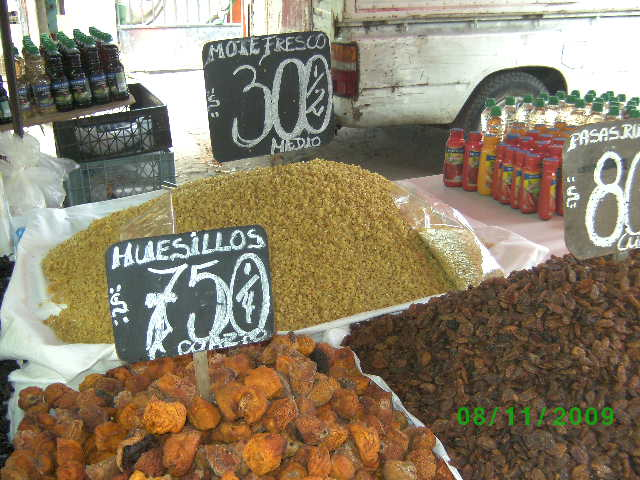
Sale of mote and huesillos at a farmers' market.

The huesillos, or dried peaches, are washed and soaked the night prior to preparation in order to rehydrate them. Once hydrated, they are cooked for thirty minutes or more in a sugar and water mixture, optionally with some natural cinnamon sticks. To give the drink its honey hue, sugar is heated in a sauce pan in order to caramelize it and bring it to a rich orange ruby color, which is added to the syrup mixture although this method is not always used. While the huesillos are cooking, the mote, or husked wheat, is cooked in water until tender. Once the mote are cooked, they are drained and added to the sweet huesillos drink, and left to cool. This combination is served chilled, in a tall glass with a tall dessert spoon for easy serving.
