= Louis LaMotte =

American business executive (1896–1984)

Louis Howell LaMotte Jr. (1896–1984) was an American business executive. Known by the nickname of "Red," LaMotte served in senior leadership positions at IBM during a 39-year career. During the 1950s, he led a task force overseeing IBM's initiative to develop computers for the U.S. government and commercial data processing. At his 1973 retirement dinner, Thomas Watson Jr., recognized LaMotte as one of his key associates. IBM has since recognized LaMotte as one of 50 Builders who grew IBM's operations, infrastructure, and identity.

== Early life and education ==
LaMotte was born in Westminster, Maryland on March 29, 1896. He graduated from Morristown School in Morristown, New Jersey. During World War I, LaMotte served as an ambulance driver for the American Field Service. He then studied at Harvard University in Cambridge, Massachusetts from 1918-1919. During his time at the school, LaMotte served as business manager of the freshman class red book and as a member of the editorial board of the Harvard Lampoon, a humor magazine. He also participated in the University Glee Club and Speaker Club.

== IBM career ==
In 1922, LaMotte began his career at IBM as a systems serviceman in New York when the company was still known as Computing-Tabulating-Recording Company. He worked in sales and managerial positions until his 1931 appointment as vice president of The Tabulating Machine Company division. In 1933, LaMotte took on the position of general manager of the Electric Accounting Machine Division. He assumed the role of Washington IBM manager for the Washington, D.C. office in 1937. During the 1930s, LaMotte played an integral role in IBM securing a large long-term contract with the Social Security Administration after its creation under the Roosevelt Administration. This contract led to IBM developing the 077 Collator to handle the agency's massive data proceeding needs.

IBM named LaMotte a vice president in 1943, and the company promoted him to vice president in charge of sales in 1952. He moved up to the role of executive vice president in charge of sales and engineering in 1954, and then to executive vice president and general manager of the Data Processing Division in 1956. LaMotte later held the position of executive vice president and special assistant to the president. He also served as chairman of the executive committee and finance committee. After retiring in 1961, he chaired the executive compensation committee from 1964 to 1971. LaMotte served as an IBM director from 1952 to 1971 and as an honorary IBM director from 1971 to 1972. He joined IBM's Advisory Board in 1972.

During the 1950s, Watson Jr. spearheaded an initiative at IBM to develop more sophisticated computers for use by the federal government and industry. This initiative sought to compete with computer development efforts at Remington Rand and other IBM competitors. Watson Jr. organized a management task force to lead the computer development initiative at IBM. This task force had four members: Watson Jr., LaMotte, Thomas Vincent Learson, and Albert Lynn Williams. Watson Jr. tasked LaMotte with overall responsibility for supervising the task force. Learson oversaw sales for the initiative, and Williams led the development of leasing agreements and pricing structures.

LaMotte represented IBM at the Office Equipment Manufacturers Institute, a trade association. (It is now the Information Technology Industry Council). In 1958, he served as the president of the Institute.

== Guidance to Thomas Watson Jr. ==
Watson Jr. sought guidance from LaMotte and treated him as an ally. In Building IBM: Shaping an Industry and Its Technology, author Emerson Pugh states, "Tom Watson found another natural ally in Louis LaMotte, a senior sales executive who had never been cowed by the elder Watson's imperious manner. In addition to McDowell, Williams, and LaMotte, there were two other members of Tom Watson's team in 1950."

Describing LaMotte in Father, So & Co: My Life at IBM and Beyond', Watson said, "He knew everybody at IBM, young and old, and he had a humane and balanced view of character that was tremendously helpful to me." In 1973, Watson Jr. spoke about LaMotte and three other IBM leaders during his retirement dinner. Watson Jr. stated, "Red LaMotte was in charge of the Washington office for a long time, and he created a happy, dedicated team. There was no one in the company who was more approachable or better liked. Red taught me a lot about morale building, and he helped me understand how to get more enjoyment out of my business life."

== Relationship to Thomas Watson Sr. ==
LaMotte was one of 42 honorary pallbearers at the 1956 tribute to Thomas Watson Sr. In the book Father, Son, & Co: My Life at IBM and Beyond, Watson Jr., described his father's relationship to LaMotte. He stated, "Of all the people at IBM, he was perhaps the only one who moved in the same social world as Dad. He came from a genteel family, rode to the hounds, went to the opera, and belonged to many of the same clubs as T.J. I think Dad was always a little resentful of him. After their reconciliation, they agreed that Red should run the Washington office, which enabled him and Dad to give each other a wide berth."

== IBM Fellowship song ==
The 1935 edition of Fellowship Songs of International Business Machines Corporation lists a song dedicated to LaMotte. Identified as song number 36, the IBM song about him has the title of "To L. H. LaMotte, General Manager, T. M. Division". It is set to the tune "My Gal Sal". The song also appears as number 42 in IBM's 1937 songbook. At the time of the song's creation, LaMotte headed the Tabulating Machines Division.

== Hilton Head Hospital ==
Louis LaMotte and his wife Lois (Gubelman) helped their son Peter to found Hilton Head Hospital on Hilton Head Island. They served as the largest financial benefactors of the hospital when it opened during the 1970s. The LaMotte Building at Hilton Head Hospital now bears their name.

Peter LaMotte served as chief of trauma surgery and chief of orthopedic surgery at Roosevelt Hospital in Manhattan. He also served as the team physician of the New York Mets baseball team from their opening expansion year of 1962 to 1974.
