= Platzer Kiebitz =

German homebuilt aircraft

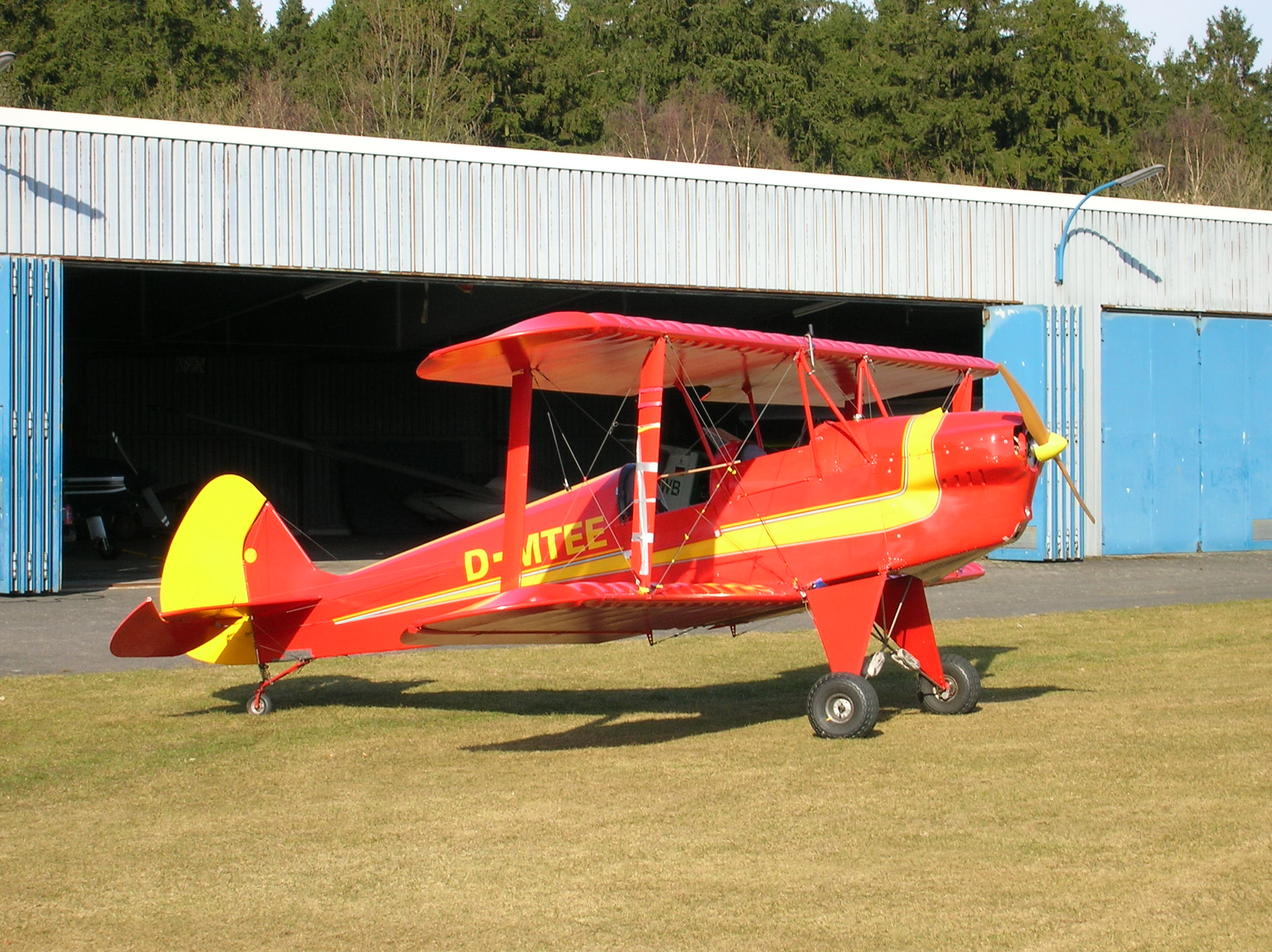

General information
- Type: Amateur-built aircraft
- National origin: Germany
- Designer: Michael Platzer
- Status: Plans available (2015)

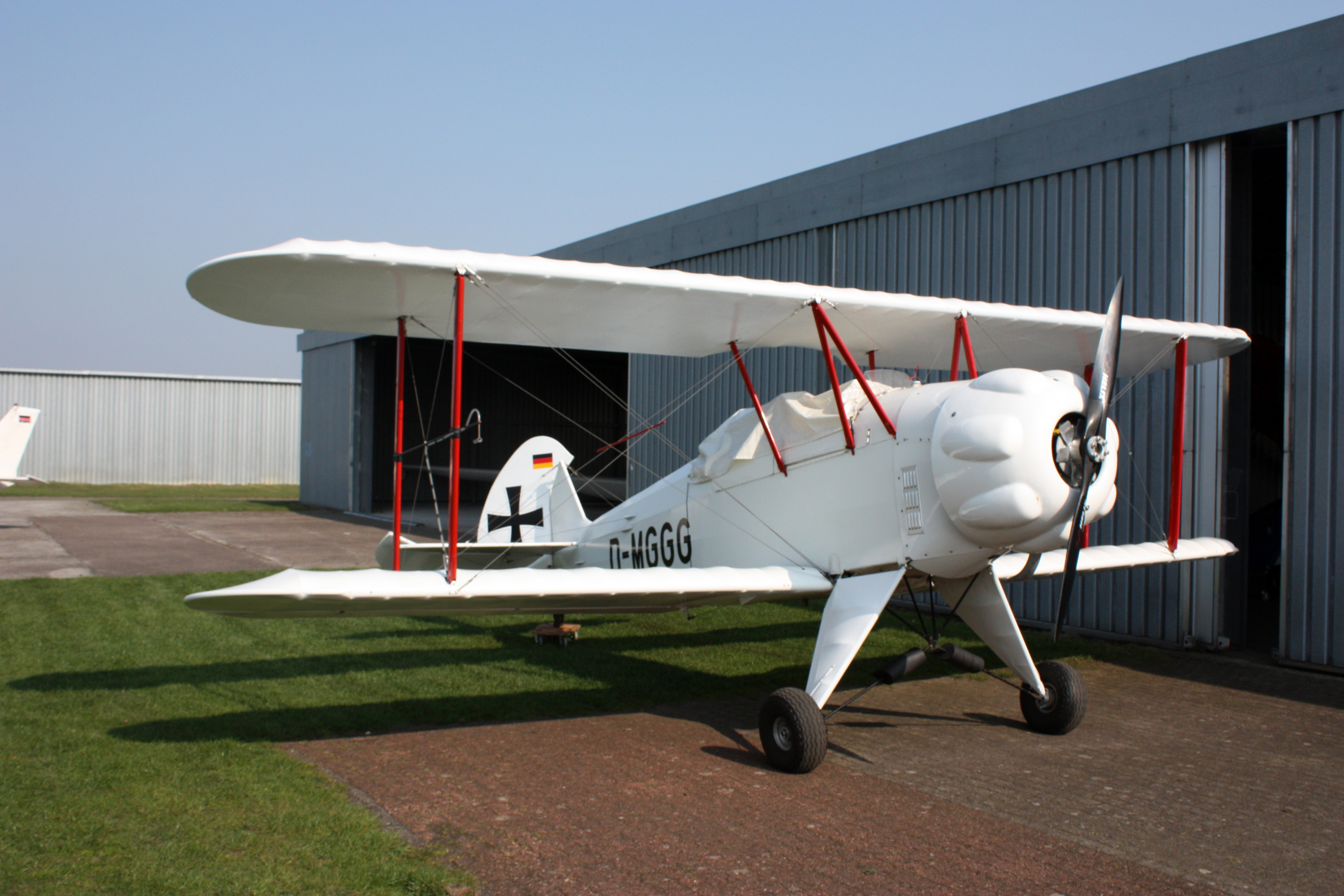
Platzer Kiebitz

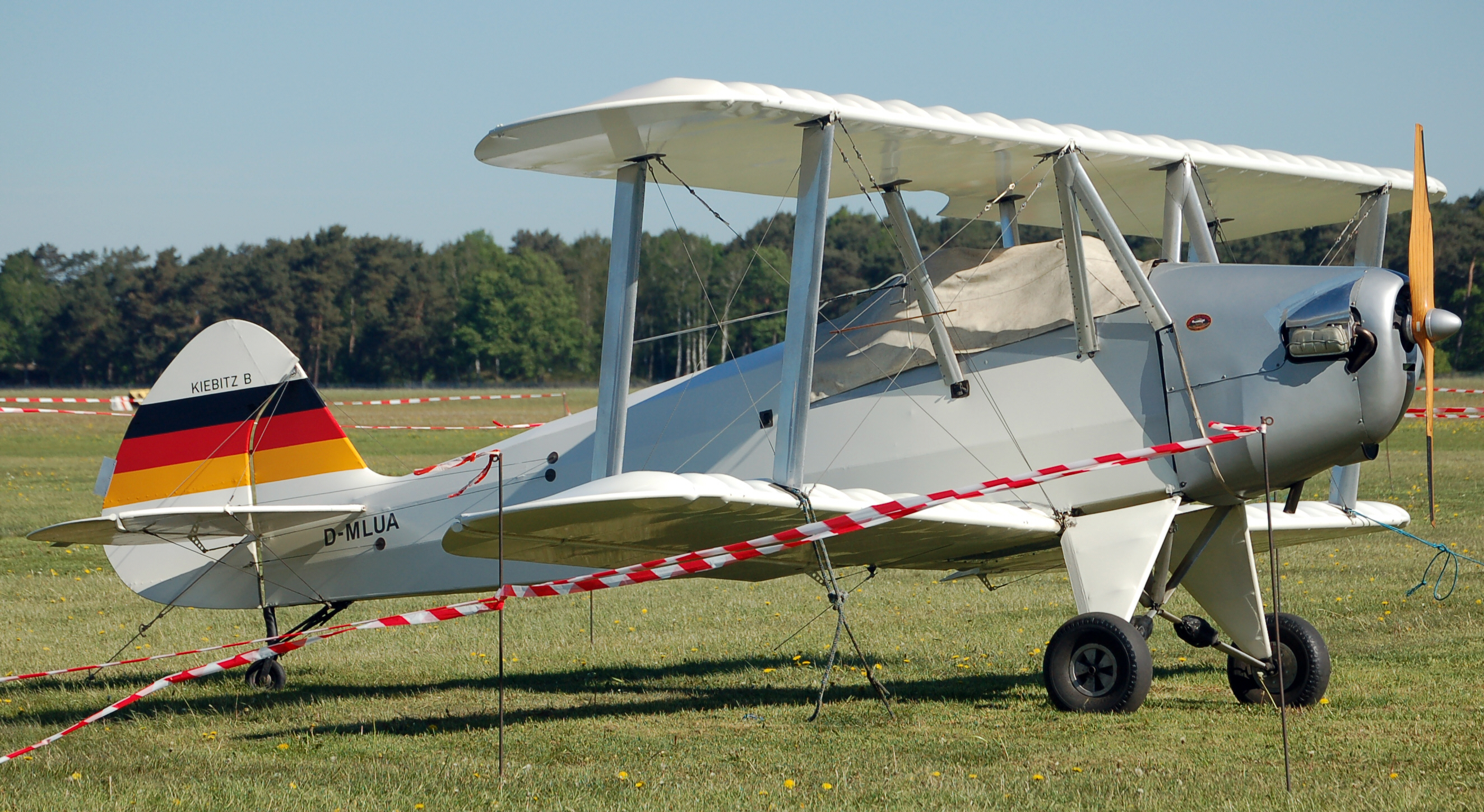
Platzer Kiebitz B powered by a Volkswagen air-cooled engine

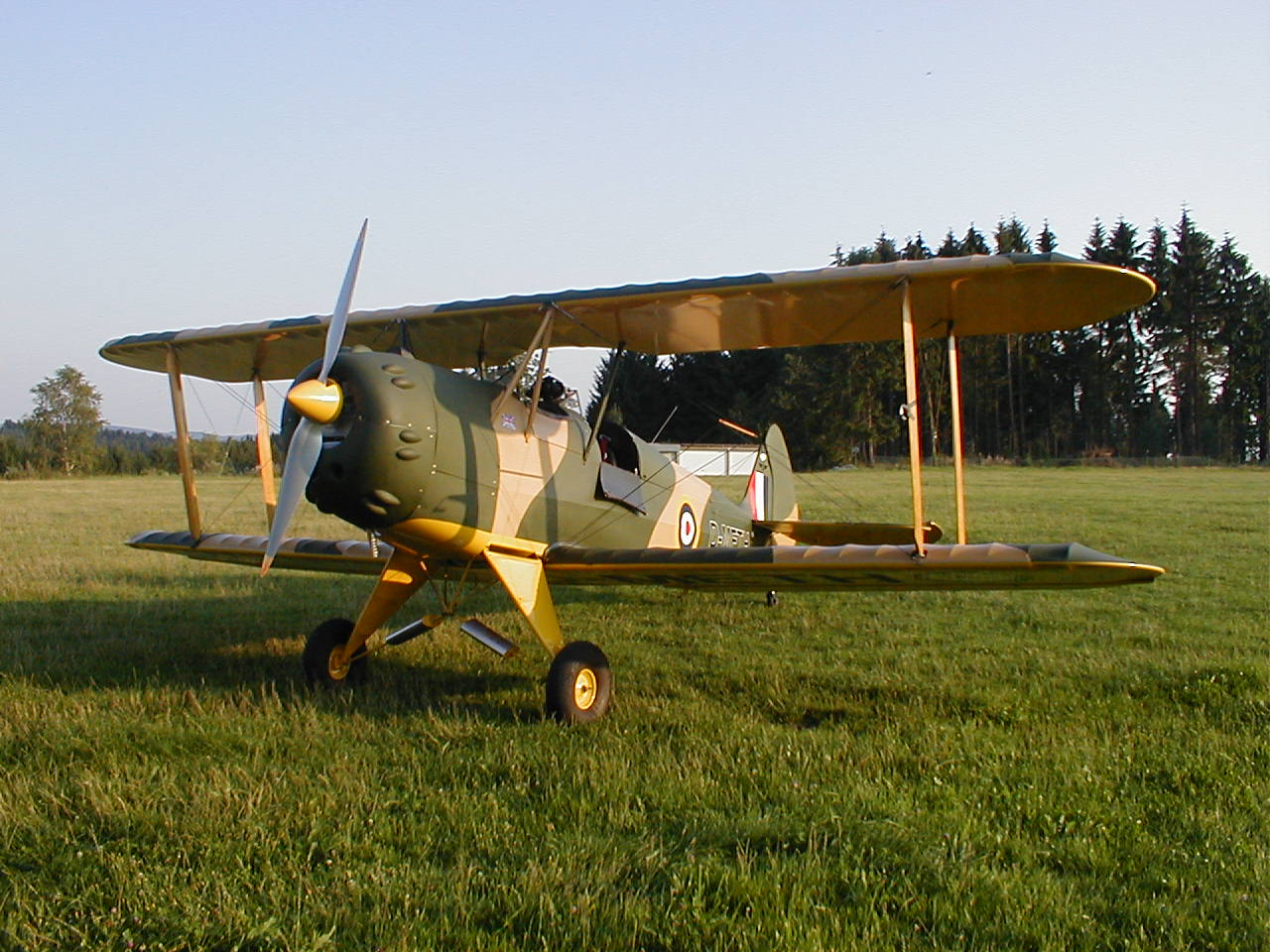
Platzer Kiebitz

The Platzer Kiebitz (English: Lapwing) is a German amateur-built aircraft designed by Michael Platzer and made available in the form of plans for amateur construction.

== Design and development ==
The Kiebitz features a strut-braced biplane configuration, a two-seats-in-tandem open cockpit with a small windshield, fixed conventional landing gear and a single engine in tractor configuration.

The aircraft fuselage is made from welded steel tubing, with its flying surfaces covered in doped aircraft fabric. Its 7.6 m (24.9 ft) span wing has an area of 18.3 m^{2} (197 sq ft) and uses interplane cable bracing. Engines from 50 to 100 hp (37 to 75 kW) can be used. The prototype used a 50 hp (37 kW) Nissan 12P automotive engine from a Nissan Micra, but Rotax, Volkswagen air-cooled engines and Sauer powerplants have also been employed.

== Operational history ==
Even though the aircraft can only be constructed from plans, the Kiebitz has proven popular with builders for the European Fédération Aéronautique Internationale microlight class.

== Specifications (Kiebitz) ==
Data from Bayerland Tacke

General characteristics

- Crew: one
- Capacity: one passenger
- Wingspan: 7.6 m (24 ft 11 in)
- Wing area: 18.3 m^{2} (197 sq ft)
- Empty weight: 200 kg (441 lb)
- Gross weight: 330 kg (728 lb)
- Fuel capacity: 50 litres (11 imp gal; 13 US gal)
- Powerplant: 1 × Nissan 12P four cylinder, liquid-cooled, four stroke automotive engine, 37 kW (50 hp)
- Propellers: three-bladed composite

Performance

- Maximum speed: 140 km/h (87 mph, 76 kn)
- Cruise speed: 125 km/h (78 mph, 67 kn)
- Stall speed: 45 km/h (28 mph, 24 kn)
- Rate of climb: 3 m/s (590 ft/min)
- Wing loading: 18.0 kg/m^{2} (3.7 lb/sq ft)
