= Moat (surname) =

Moat is an English and Scottish surname. It van be either topographic surname for someone who lived by a moat or a toponymic surname derived from any of plves named Moat. The meaning of the name is "protective ditch". Notable people with the surname include:

- John Moat (1936–2014), British poet
- Raoul Moat (1973–2010), British perpetrator of the 2010 Northumbria Police manhunt
- Richard Moat (born 1954), British businessman
- William Pollock Moat (1827–1895), New Zealand politician
