= Moment of Truth (2021 TV series) =

American documentary web series

- Genre: True crime
- Directed by: Matthew Perniciaro; Clay Johnson
- Country of origin: United States
- No. of seasons: 1
- No. of episodes: 5

Production
- Executive producers: Jimmy Goodmon; Shelly Leslie; Michael Sherman; Matthew Perniciaro
- Production companies: Capitol Broadcasting Company; Bow and Arrow Entertainment

Original release
- Network: IMDb TV
- Release: April 2, 2021

Moment of Truth is a five-episode American documentary series that explores the murder of James R. Jordan Sr., the father of Michael Jordan, in 1993. It premiered on IMDb TV on April 21, 2021.

== Premise ==
It is the story behind the murder of James Jordan in North Carolina, as well as the subsequent trial.

== Episodes ==
No. in season	Title	Length (minutes)
1	"Chapter One - An Unfillable Void"	TBA
James Jordan, the father of the most famous basketball player on the planet, is found dead in a swamp in South Carolina resulting in a multi-state manhunt searching for his killer.
2	"Chapter Two - The Most Dangerous County In America"	TBA
It is revealed that James Jordan was killed in Robeson County, North Carolina. We look into the dark history of this rural area on the southern border of the state, one filled with crime, racial injustice and corruption in law enforcement.
3	"Chapter Three - The Wronged Man"	TBA
Daniel Green tells his story after being arrested for the murder. We examine his life, as both sides prepare their cases for trial. While Daniel declares his innocence, Larry Demery takes a plea deal and prepares to testify against him.
4	"Chapter Four - Best Friends"	TBA
Larry takes the stand and pins the murder on Daniel. The defense makes their case, but we learn the jury did not hear all the evidence, and one piece of information brings the entire case into doubt.
5	"Chapter Five - Can The Truth Set You Free"	TBA
Daniel and Larry begin their prison sentences and Daniel continues to maintain his innocence. Daniel finds an advocate in Christine Mumma. Christine re-evaluates the case in an effort to receive a new hearing from the courts.

== Reception ==
Richard Roeper awarded Moment of Truth 3 and 1/2 out of 4 stars and called the series, "a stunningly revelatory five-part IMDb TV documentary series." The series currently sits at 100% fresh rating on Rotten Tomatoes based on 5 reviews.
