= William A. Mott =

Canadian politician

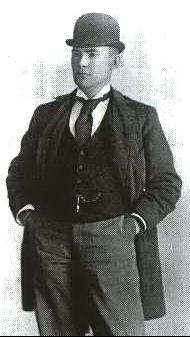
William A. Mott

William Albert Mott (November 29, 1864 – December 1, 1911) was a lawyer and political figure in New Brunswick, Canada. He represented Restigouche County in the Legislative Assembly of New Brunswick from 1892 to 1903.

He was born in Campbellton, New Brunswick, the son of William Mott, and was educated in Dalhousie. He was called to the bar in 1888 and entered practice in partnership with John McAlister. He was mayor of Campbellton in 1892. In 1894, Mott married Harriet E. Henderson. He served as consul for Norway and Sweden.
