= List of United Kingdom locations: Peo-Pn =

The United Kingdom

This is part of the list of United Kingdom locations: a gazetteer of place names in the United Kingdom showing each place's locality and geographical coordinates.

== Pe continued... ==
=== Peo ===
| Location | Locality | Coordinates (links to map & photo sources) | OS grid reference |
|---|---|---|---|
| Peopleton | Worcestershire | 52.14°N 02.10°W | SO9350 |
| Peover Heath | Cheshire | 53.25°N 02.31°W | SJ7973 |

=== Pep ===
| Location | Locality | Coordinates (links to map & photo sources) | OS grid reference |
|---|---|---|---|
| Peper Harow | Surrey | 51.18°N 00.67°W | SU9344 |
| Peppercombe | Devon | 50.98°N 04.30°W | SS3823 |
| Pepper Hill | Calderdale | 53.74°N 01.83°W | SE1128 |
| Peppermoor | Northumberland | 55.42°N 01.65°W | NU2215 |
| Pepper's Green | Essex | 51.76°N 00.34°E | TL6210 |
| Pepperstock | Bedfordshire | 51.85°N 00.43°W | TL0818 |

=== Per ===
| Location | Locality | Coordinates (links to map & photo sources) | OS grid reference |
|---|---|---|---|
| Perceton | North Ayrshire | 55.62°N 04.62°W | NS3540 |
| Percuil | Cornwall | 50.16°N 05.01°W | SW8534 |
| Percy Main | North Tyneside | 54.99°N 01.47°W | NZ3467 |
| Perham Down | Wiltshire | 51.23°N 01.64°W | SU2549 |
| Periton | Somerset | 51.19°N 03.48°W | SS9645 |
| Perivale | Ealing | 51.53°N 00.32°W | TQ1683 |
| Perkhill | Aberdeenshire | 57.13°N 02.71°W | NJ5705 |
| Perkin's Village | Devon | 50.71°N 03.38°W | SY0291 |
| Perkinsville | Durham | 54.87°N 01.61°W | NZ2553 |
| Perlethorpe | Nottinghamshire | 53.23°N 01.04°W | SK6471 |
| Perranarworthal | Cornwall | 50.20°N 05.12°W | SW7738 |
| Perrancoombe | Cornwall | 50.32°N 05.16°W | SW7552 |
| Perran Downs | Cornwall | 50.11°N 05.42°W | SW5530 |
| Perranporth | Cornwall | 50.34°N 05.16°W | SW7554 |
| Perranuthnoe | Cornwall | 50.10°N 05.45°W | SW5329 |
| Perranwell (Perranzabuloe) | Cornwall | 50.32°N 05.13°W | SW7752 |
| Perranwell (Perranarworthal) | Cornwall | 50.20°N 05.12°W | SW7739 |
| Perranwell Station | Cornwall | 50.20°N 05.11°W | SW7839 |
| Perran Wharf | Cornwall | 50.20°N 05.12°W | SW7738 |
| Perranzabuloe | Cornwall | 50.32°N 05.13°W | SW7752 |
| Perrott's Brook | Gloucestershire | 51.75°N 01.98°W | SP0106 |
| Perry | Devon | 50.83°N 03.62°W | SS8605 |
| Perry | Birmingham | 52.52°N 01.89°W | SP0792 |
| Perry | Kent | 51.28°N 01.22°E | TR2559 |
| Perry Barr | Birmingham | 52.52°N 01.91°W | SP0692 |
| Perry Beeches | Birmingham | 52.53°N 01.92°W | SP0593 |
| Perry Common | Birmingham | 52.53°N 01.86°W | SP0993 |
| Perry Crofts | Staffordshire | 52.63°N 01.69°W | SK2104 |
| Perryfields | Worcestershire | 52.33°N 02.08°W | SO9471 |
| Perryfoot | Derbyshire | 53.32°N 01.85°W | SK1081 |
| Perry Green | Somerset | 51.13°N 03.04°W | ST2738 |
| Perry Green | Hertfordshire | 51.83°N 00.07°E | TL4317 |
| Perry Green | Essex | 51.86°N 00.61°E | TL8022 |
| Perry Green | Wiltshire | 51.60°N 02.05°W | ST9689 |
| Perrymead | Bath and North East Somerset | 51.36°N 02.36°W | ST7563 |
| Perrystone Hill | Herefordshire | 51.95°N 02.53°W | SO6329 |
| Perry Street | Somerset | 50.84°N 02.95°W | ST3305 |
| Perry Street | Kent | 51.43°N 00.34°E | TQ6373 |
| Perry Vale | Lewisham | 51.435°N 0.043°W | TQ361725 |
| Perrywood | Kent | 51.25°N 00.92°E | TR0455 |
| Pershall | Staffordshire | 52.85°N 02.28°W | SJ8129 |
| Pershore | Worcestershire | 52.10°N 02.08°W | SO9445 |
| Pertenhall | Bedfordshire | 52.27°N 00.41°W | TL0865 |
| Perth | Perth and Kinross | 56.39°N 03.44°W | NO1123 |
| Perthcelyn | Rhondda, Cynon, Taff | 51.66°N 03.37°W | ST0597 |
| Perthy | Shropshire | 52.89°N 02.95°W | SJ3633 |
| Perton | Staffordshire | 52.58°N 02.20°W | SO8699 |
| Perton | Herefordshire | 52.05°N 02.59°W | SO5940 |
| Pertwood | Wiltshire | 51.11°N 02.17°W | ST8835 |

=== Pes ===
| Location | Locality | Coordinates (links to map & photo sources) | OS grid reference |
|---|---|---|---|
| Pestalozzi International Village | East Sussex | 50.92°N 00.53°E | TQ7817 |
| Pested | Kent | 51.22°N 00.86°E | TR0051 |

=== Pet ===
| Location | Locality | Coordinates (links to map & photo sources) | OS grid reference |
|---|---|---|---|
| Peterborough | City of Peterborough | 52.57°N 00.24°W | TL1999 |
| Peterchurch | Herefordshire | 52.03°N 02.96°W | SO3438 |
| Peterculter | City of Aberdeen | 57.10°N 02.26°W | NJ8401 |
| Peterhead | Aberdeenshire | 57.50°N 01.78°W | NK1346 |
| Peterlee | Durham | 54.75°N 01.34°W | NZ4240 |
| Petersburn | North Lanarkshire | 55.85°N 03.96°W | NS7764 |
| Petersfield | Hampshire | 51.00°N 00.94°W | SU7423 |
| Peter's Finger | Devon | 50.66°N 04.33°W | SX3588 |
| Peters Green | Hertfordshire | 51.85°N 00.34°W | TL1419 |
| Petersham | Richmond Upon Thames | 51.44°N 00.31°W | TQ1773 |
| Peters Marland | Devon | 50.89°N 04.17°W | SS4713 |
| Peterstone Wentlooge | City of Newport | 51.51°N 03.06°W | ST2680 |
| Peterston-super-Ely | The Vale Of Glamorgan | 51.47°N 03.32°W | ST0876 |
| Peterstow | Herefordshire | 51.91°N 02.64°W | SO5624 |
| Peter Tavy | Devon | 50.57°N 04.10°W | SX5177 |
| Petertown | Orkney Islands | 58.91°N 03.21°W | HY3004 |
| Peterville | Cornwall | 50.30°N 05.20°W | SW7250 |
| Petham | Kent | 51.21°N 01.04°E | TR1351 |
| Petherwin Gate | Cornwall | 50.67°N 04.43°W | SX2889 |
| Petrockstowe | Devon | 50.86°N 04.11°W | SS5109 |
| Petsoe End | Milton Keynes | 52.13°N 00.70°W | SP8949 |
| Pett | East Sussex | 50.88°N 00.65°E | TQ8713 |
| Pettaugh | Suffolk | 52.18°N 01.15°E | TM1659 |
| Pett Bottom (Brabourne) | Kent | 51.14°N 01.01°E | TR1143 |
| Pett Bottom (Canterbury) | Kent | 51.22°N 01.09°E | TR1652 |
| Petteridge | Kent | 51.14°N 00.37°E | TQ6641 |
| Pettinain | South Lanarkshire | 55.66°N 03.67°W | NS9542 |
| Pettings | Kent | 51.34°N 00.31°E | TQ6163 |
| Pettistree | Suffolk | 52.13°N 01.34°E | TM2954 |
| Pett Level | East Sussex | 50.88°N 00.67°E | TQ8813 |
| Petton | Devon | 51.00°N 03.42°W | ST0024 |
| Petton | Shropshire | 52.82°N 02.84°W | SJ4326 |
| Petts Wood | Bromley | 51.38°N 00.06°E | TQ4467 |
| Petty France | South Gloucestershire | 51.56°N 02.31°W | ST7885 |
| Pettywell | Norfolk | 52.76°N 01.08°E | TG0823 |
| Petworth | West Sussex | 50.98°N 00.61°W | SU9721 |

=== Pev ===
| Location | Locality | Coordinates (links to map & photo sources) | OS grid reference |
|---|---|---|---|
| Pevensey | East Sussex | 50.81°N 00.32°E | TQ6404 |
| Pevensey Bay | East Sussex | 50.81°N 00.34°E | TQ6504 |
| Peverell | Devon | 50.38°N 04.15°W | SX4756 |

=== Pew ===
| Location | Locality | Coordinates (links to map & photo sources) | OS grid reference |
|---|---|---|---|
| Pewet Island | Essex | 51.73°N 00.87°E | TL988083 |
| Pewit Island | Essex | 51.89°N 01.23°E | TM228265 |
| Pewsey | Wiltshire | 51.33°N 01.77°W | SU1660 |
| Pewsey Wharf | Wiltshire | 51.34°N 01.78°W | SU1561 |
| Pewterspear | Cheshire | 53.34°N 02.57°W | SJ6283 |

== Ph ==
| Location | Locality | Coordinates (links to map & photo sources) | OS grid reference |
|---|---|---|---|
| Phantassie | East Lothian | 55.98°N 02.65°W | NT5977 |
| Pharisee Green | Essex | 51.85°N 00.33°E | TL6120 |
| Pheasants | Buckinghamshire | 51.58°N 00.86°W | SU7988 |
| Pheasant's Hill | Buckinghamshire | 51.57°N 00.87°W | SU7887 |
| Pheasey | Walsall | 52.55°N 01.91°W | SP0695 |
| Phoenix Green | Hampshire | 51.28°N 00.92°W | SU7555 |
| Phepson | Worcestershire | 52.22°N 02.08°W | SO9459 |
| Philadelphia | Sunderland | 54.86°N 01.48°W | NZ3352 |
| Philham | Devon | 50.97°N 04.49°W | SS2522 |
| Philiphaugh | Scottish Borders | 55.53°N 02.88°W | NT4427 |
| Phillack | Cornwall | 50.19°N 05.42°W | SW5638 |
| Philleigh | Cornwall | 50.21°N 04.98°W | SW8739 |
| Phillip's Town | Caerphilly | 51.71°N 03.24°W | SO1403 |
| Philpot End | Essex | 51.83°N 00.33°E | TL6118 |
| Philpstoun | West Lothian | 55.96°N 03.53°W | NT0476 |
| Phocle Green | Herefordshire | 51.93°N 02.55°W | SO6226 |
| Phoenix Row | Durham | 54.65°N 01.75°W | NZ1629 |

== Pi ==
=== Pia–Pik ===
| Location | Locality | Coordinates (links to map & photo sources) | OS grid reference |
|---|---|---|---|
| Pibsbury | Somerset | 51.03°N 02.80°W | ST4426 |
| Pibwrlwyd | Carmarthenshire | 51.83°N 04.30°W | SN4118 |
| Pica | Cumbria | 54.58°N 03.51°W | NY0222 |
| Piccadilly | Warwickshire | 52.57°N 01.67°W | SP2298 |
| Piccadilly | Rotherham | 53.47°N 01.32°W | SK4598 |
| Piccadilly Corner | Norfolk | 52.42°N 01.33°E | TM2786 |
| Piccotts End | Hertfordshire | 51.77°N 00.47°W | TL0509 |
| Pickburn | Doncaster | 53.55°N 01.23°W | SE5107 |
| Picken End | Herefordshire | 52.07°N 02.27°W | SO8142 |
| Pickering | North Yorkshire | 54.24°N 00.78°W | SE7984 |
| Pickering Nook | Durham | 54.88°N 01.73°W | NZ1755 |
| Pickerton | Angus | 56.65°N 02.71°W | NO5652 |
| Picket Hill | Hampshire | 50.84°N 01.74°W | SU1805 |
| Picket Piece | Hampshire | 51.21°N 01.44°W | SU3946 |
| Pickett's Lock | Enfield | 51.626°N 00.032°W | TQ362937 |
| Pickford | Coventry | 52.42°N 01.60°W | SP2781 |
| Pickford Green | Coventry | 52.42°N 01.60°W | SP2781 |
| Pickhill | North Yorkshire | 54.24°N 01.47°W | SE3483 |
| Picklenash | Gloucestershire | 51.93°N 02.42°W | SO7126 |
| Picklescott | Shropshire | 52.58°N 02.84°W | SO4399 |
| Pickles Hill | Bradford | 53.83°N 01.97°W | SE0238 |
| Pickley Green | Wigan | 53.51°N 02.52°W | SD6502 |
| Pickmere | Cheshire | 53.28°N 02.46°W | SJ6977 |
| Pickney | Somerset | 51.05°N 03.15°W | ST1929 |
| Pickstock | Shropshire | 52.80°N 02.41°W | SJ7223 |
| Pickup Bank | Lancashire | 53.69°N 02.42°W | SD7222 |
| Pickwell | Leicestershire | 52.69°N 00.84°W | SK7811 |
| Pickwick | Wiltshire | 51.42°N 02.20°W | ST8670 |
| Pickwood Scar | Calderdale | 53.69°N 01.89°W | SE0722 |
| Pickworth | Lincolnshire | 52.88°N 00.45°W | TF0433 |
| Pickworth | Rutland | 52.70°N 00.53°W | SK9913 |
| Picton | Cheshire | 53.23°N 02.85°W | SJ4371 |
| Picton | Flintshire | 53.32°N 03.32°W | SJ1282 |
| Picton | North Yorkshire | 54.45°N 01.36°W | NZ4107 |
| Pict's Hill | Somerset | 51.03°N 02.81°W | ST4327 |
| Piddinghoe | East Sussex | 50.80°N 00.02°E | TQ4302 |
| Piddington | Northamptonshire | 52.17°N 00.83°W | SP8054 |
| Piddington | Oxfordshire | 51.84°N 01.07°W | SP6417 |
| Piddington | Buckinghamshire | 51.63°N 00.84°W | SU8094 |
| Piddlehinton | Dorset | 50.77°N 02.41°W | SY7197 |
| Piddletrenthide | Dorset | 50.78°N 02.42°W | SY7099 |
| Pidley | Cambridgeshire | 52.37°N 00.04°W | TL3377 |
| Pidney | Dorset | 50.87°N 02.37°W | ST7408 |
| Piece | Cornwall | 50.20°N 05.26°W | SW6739 |
| Piercebridge | Darlington | 54.53°N 01.69°W | NZ2015 |
| Piercing Hill | Essex | 51.67°N 00.08°E | TQ4499 |
| Pierowall | Orkney Islands | 59.31°N 03.00°W | HY4348 |
| Piff's Elm | Gloucestershire | 51.92°N 02.14°W | SO9025 |
| Pigdon | Northumberland | 55.18°N 01.76°W | NZ1588 |
| Pightley | Somerset | 51.10°N 03.11°W | ST2235 |
| Pig Oak | Dorset | 50.82°N 01.97°W | SU0203 |
| Pigstye Green | Essex | 51.72°N 00.31°E | TL6005 |
| Pike End | Calderdale | 53.64°N 01.97°W | SE0217 |
| Pikehall | Derbyshire | 53.12°N 01.71°W | SK1959 |
| Pike Hill | Lancashire | 53.78°N 02.21°W | SD8632 |
| Pike Law | Calderdale | 53.64°N 01.94°W | SE0417 |
| Pikeshill | Hampshire | 50.87°N 01.58°W | SU2908 |
| Pikestye | Herefordshire | 52.12°N 02.68°W | SO5348 |

=== Pil ===
| Location | Locality | Coordinates (links to map & photo sources) | OS grid reference |
|---|---|---|---|
| Pilford | Dorset | 50.80°N 01.95°W | SU0301 |
| Pilgrims Hatch | Essex | 51.63°N 00.28°E | TQ5895 |
| Pilham | Lincolnshire | 53.42°N 00.70°W | SK8693 |
| Pilhough | Derbyshire | 53.17°N 01.62°W | SK2564 |
| Pill | Pembrokeshire | 51.70°N 05.02°W | SM9105 |
| Pill | North Somerset | 51.47°N 02.69°W | ST5275 |
| Pillaton | Cornwall | 50.45°N 04.31°W | SX3664 |
| Pillaton | Staffordshire | 52.71°N 02.09°W | SJ9413 |
| Pillerton Hersey | Warwickshire | 52.12°N 01.56°W | SP3048 |
| Pillerton Priors | Warwickshire | 52.12°N 01.57°W | SP2947 |
| Pilleth | Powys | 52.30°N 03.10°W | SO2568 |
| Pilley | Hampshire | 50.78°N 01.53°W | SZ3398 |
| Pilley | Gloucestershire | 51.86°N 02.07°W | SO9519 |
| Pilley | Barnsley | 53.49°N 01.50°W | SE3300 |
| Pilley Bailey | Hampshire | 50.78°N 01.53°W | SZ3398 |
| Pillgwenlly | City of Newport | 51.57°N 02.99°W | ST3187 |
| Pilling | Lancashire | 53.92°N 02.91°W | SD4048 |
| Pilling Lane | Lancashire | 53.93°N 02.96°W | SD3749 |
| Pillmouth | Devon | 50.99°N 04.19°W | SS4624 |
| Pillowell | Gloucestershire | 51.75°N 02.55°W | SO6206 |
| Pillows Green | Gloucestershire | 51.95°N 02.30°W | SO7929 |
| Pillwell | Dorset | 50.97°N 02.31°W | ST7819 |
| Pilmuir | Moray | 57.60°N 03.64°W | NJ0258 |
| Pilmuir | Scottish Borders | 55.39°N 02.82°W | NT4811 |
| Pilning | South Gloucestershire | 51.56°N 02.65°W | ST5585 |
| Pilrig | City of Edinburgh | 55.96°N 03.18°W | NT2675 |
| Pilsdon | Dorset | 50.78°N 02.83°W | SY4199 |
| Pilsgate | Cambridgeshire | 52.63°N 00.43°W | TF0605 |
| Pilsley (Derbyshire Dales) | Derbyshire | 53.15°N 01.37°W | SK4262 |
| Pilsley (North East Derbyshire) | Derbyshire | 53.23°N 01.64°W | SK2471 |
| Pilsley Green | Derbyshire | 53.14°N 01.37°W | SK4261 |
| Pilson Green | Norfolk | 52.66°N 01.50°E | TG3713 |
| Piltdown | East Sussex | 50.97°N 00.05°E | TQ4422 |
| Pilton | Devon | 51.08°N 04.07°W | SS5534 |
| Pilton | Somerset | 51.15°N 02.58°W | ST5940 |
| Pilton | Northamptonshire | 52.44°N 00.50°W | TL0284 |
| Pilton | Rutland | 52.60°N 00.65°W | SK9102 |
| Pilton | City of Edinburgh | 55.97°N 03.23°W | NT2376 |
| Pilton Green | Swansea | 51.56°N 04.25°W | SS4487 |
| Piltown | Somerset | 51.13°N 02.64°W | ST5538 |

=== Pim–Pip ===
| Location | Locality | Coordinates (links to map & photo sources) | OS grid reference |
|---|---|---|---|
| Pimhole | Bury | 53.58°N 02.28°W | SD8110 |
| Pimlico | Hertfordshire | 51.73°N 00.42°W | TL0905 |
| Pimlico | City of Westminster | 51.48°N 00.14°W | TQ2978 |
| Pimlico | Lancashire | 53.88°N 02.39°W | SD7443 |
| Pimperne (North Dorset) | Dorset | 50.88°N 02.14°W | ST9009 |
| Pimperne (West Dorset) | Dorset | 50.87°N 02.61°W | ST5708 |
| Pinchbeck | Lincolnshire | 52.80°N 00.17°W | TF2325 |
| Pinchbeck West | Lincolnshire | 52.80°N 00.22°W | TF2024 |
| Pincheon Green | Doncaster | 53.64°N 01.01°W | SE6517 |
| Pinchinthorpe | Redcar and Cleveland | 54.53°N 01.10°W | NZ5815 |
| Pinckney Green | Wiltshire | 51.37°N 02.28°W | ST8064 |
| Pincock | Lancashire | 53.64°N 02.68°W | SD5517 |
| Pineham | Kent | 51.15°N 01.30°E | TR3145 |
| Pineham | Milton Keynes | 52.06°N 00.71°W | SP8841 |
| Pinehurst | Swindon | 51.58°N 01.78°W | SU1587 |
| Pinewood | Berkshire | 51.39°N 00.80°W | SU838660 |
| Pinewood | Hampshire | 51.12°N 00.86°W | SU796364 |
| Pinfarthings | Gloucestershire | 51.69°N 02.21°W | SO8500 |
| Pinfold | Lancashire | 53.59°N 02.93°W | SD3811 |
| Pinfold Hill | Barnsley | 53.51°N 01.56°W | SE2902 |
| Pinfoldpond | Bedfordshire | 51.97°N 00.64°W | SP9332 |
| Pinford End | Suffolk | 52.19°N 00.69°E | TL8459 |
| Pinged | Carmarthenshire | 51.70°N 04.28°W | SN4203 |
| Pingewood | Berkshire | 51.41°N 01.00°W | SU6969 |
| Pin Green | Hertfordshire | 51.91°N 00.19°W | TL2425 |
| Pinhoe | Devon | 50.73°N 03.47°W | SX9694 |
| Pinkett's Booth | Coventry | 52.42°N 01.60°W | SP2781 |
| Pink Green | Worcestershire | 52.31°N 01.88°W | SP0869 |
| Pinkie Braes | East Lothian | 55.93°N 03.02°W | NT3672 |
| Pinkney | Wiltshire | 51.57°N 02.20°W | ST8686 |
| Pinkneys Green | Berkshire | 51.53°N 00.77°W | SU8582 |
| Pinksmoor | Somerset | 50.96°N 03.28°W | ST1019 |
| Pinley | Coventry | 52.39°N 01.48°W | SP3577 |
| Pinley Green | Warwickshire | 52.29°N 01.70°W | SP2066 |
| Pinmore | South Ayrshire | 55.18°N 04.82°W | NX2091 |
| Pinnacles | Essex | 51.76°N 00.05°E | TL4209 |
| Pinner | Hillingdon | 51.58°N 00.39°W | TQ1189 |
| Pinner Green | Harrow | 51.59°N 00.39°W | TQ1190 |
| Pinnerwood Park | Harrow | 51.59°N 00.39°W | TQ1190 |
| Pin's Green | Worcestershire | 52.13°N 02.29°W | SO8049 |
| Pinsley Green | Cheshire | 53.01°N 02.62°W | SJ5846 |
| Pinstones | Shropshire | 52.46°N 02.76°W | SO4886 |
| Pinvin | Worcestershire | 52.13°N 02.07°W | SO9548 |
| Pinwall | Leicestershire | 52.59°N 01.55°W | SK3000 |
| Pinwherry | South Ayrshire | 55.13°N 04.84°W | NX1986 |
| Pinxton | Derbyshire | 53.08°N 01.32°W | SK4554 |
| Pipe and Lyde | Herefordshire | 52.09°N 02.73°W | SO5044 |
| Pipe Gate | Shropshire | 52.95°N 02.40°W | SJ7340 |
| Pipehill | Staffordshire | 52.66°N 01.86°W | SK0908 |
| Pipehouse | Bath and North East Somerset | 51.32°N 02.33°W | ST7759 |
| Piperhill | Highland | 57.52°N 03.90°W | NH8650 |
| Pipe Ridware | Staffordshire | 52.75°N 01.86°W | SK0917 |
| Piper's Ash | Cheshire | 53.19°N 02.85°W | SJ4367 |
| Piper's End | Worcestershire | 52.00°N 02.23°W | SO8434 |
| Piper's Hill | Worcestershire | 52.28°N 02.06°W | SO9665 |
| Pipers Pool | Cornwall | 50.62°N 04.46°W | SX2684 |
| Pipewell | Northamptonshire | 52.45°N 00.77°W | SP8385 |
| Pippacott | Devon | 51.11°N 04.11°W | SS5237 |
| Pippin Street | Lancashire | 53.71°N 02.62°W | SD5924 |
| Pipps Hill | Essex | 51.57°N 00.43°E | TQ6989 |
| Pipsden | Kent | 51.04°N 00.52°E | TQ7730 |

=== Pir–Piz ===
| Location | Locality | Coordinates (links to map & photo sources) | OS grid reference |
|---|---|---|---|
| Pirbright | Surrey | 51.28°N 00.65°W | SU9455 |
| Pirbright Camp | Surrey | 51.29°N 00.68°W | SU9256 |
| Pirnmill | North Ayrshire | 55.64°N 05.38°W | NR8744 |
| Pirton | Worcestershire | 52.12°N 02.17°W | SO8847 |
| Pirton | Hertfordshire | 51.96°N 00.34°W | TL1431 |
| Pisgah | Ceredigion | 52.37°N 03.95°W | SN6777 |
| Pisgah | Stirling | 56.17°N 03.95°W | NN7900 |
| Pishill | Oxfordshire | 51.59°N 00.96°W | SU7289 |
| Pishill Bank | Oxfordshire | 51.60°N 00.97°W | SU7190 |
| Pismire Hill | Sheffield | 53.41°N 01.44°W | SK3791 |
| Pistyll | Gwynedd | 52.94°N 04.50°W | SH3242 |
| Pit | Monmouthshire | 51.77°N 02.91°W | SO3709 |
| Pitblae | Aberdeenshire | 57.67°N 02.03°W | NJ9865 |
| Pitcairngreen | Perth and Kinross | 56.42°N 03.52°W | NO0627 |
| Pitcalnie | Highland | 57.72°N 04.01°W | NH8072 |
| Pitcaple | Aberdeenshire | 57.31°N 02.46°W | NJ7225 |
| Pitchcombe | Gloucestershire | 51.77°N 02.21°W | SO8508 |
| Pitchcott | Buckinghamshire | 51.87°N 00.88°W | SP7720 |
| Pitcher's Green | Suffolk | 52.18°N 00.79°E | TL9158 |
| Pitchford | Shropshire | 52.62°N 02.69°W | SJ5303 |
| Pitch Green | Buckinghamshire | 51.72°N 00.88°W | SP7703 |
| Pitch Place (Thursley) | Surrey | 51.14°N 00.72°W | SU8939 |
| Pitch Place (Guildford) | Surrey | 51.25°N 00.61°W | SU9752 |
| Pitcombe | Somerset | 51.09°N 02.47°W | ST6733 |
| Pitcorthie | Fife | 56.05°N 03.43°W | NT1186 |
| Pitcot | Somerset | 51.23°N 02.50°W | ST6549 |
| Pitcot | The Vale of Glamorgan | 51.45°N 03.59°W | SS8974 |
| Pitcox | East Lothian | 55.968°N 2.575°W | NT6475 |
| Pitempton | City of Dundee | 56.49°N 03.00°W | NO3834 |
| Pitfichie | Aberdeenshire | 57.23°N 02.54°W | NJ6716 |
| Pitgrudy | Highland | 57.89°N 04.04°W | NH7991 |
| Pitlessie | Fife | 56.26°N 03.08°W | NO3309 |
| Pitlochry | Perth and Kinross | 56.70°N 03.73°W | NN9458 |
| Pitmaduthy | Highland | 57.75°N 04.06°W | NH7776 |
| Pitmedden | Aberdeenshire | 57.33°N 02.18°W | NJ8927 |
| Pitminster | Somerset | 50.96°N 03.11°W | ST2219 |
| Pitmuies | Angus | 56.63°N 02.71°W | NO5649 |
| Pitmunie | Aberdeenshire | 57.22°N 02.56°W | NJ6615 |
| Pitney | Somerset | 51.04°N 02.78°W | ST4528 |
| Pitpointie | Angus | 56.52°N 03.05°W | NO3537 |
| Pitreuchie | Angus | 56.63°N 02.88°W | NO4649 |
| Pitscottie | Fife | 56.30°N 02.95°W | NO4113 |
| Pitsea | Essex | 51.56°N 00.49°E | TQ7388 |
| Pitses | Oldham | 53.52°N 02.09°W | SD9403 |
| Pitsford | Northamptonshire | 52.30°N 00.90°W | SP7568 |
| Pitsford Hill | Somerset | 51.06°N 03.28°W | ST1030 |
| Pitsmoor | Sheffield | 53.39°N 01.46°W | SK3689 |
| Pitstone | Buckinghamshire | 51.81°N 00.63°W | SP9414 |
| Pitstone Green | Buckinghamshire | 51.82°N 00.63°W | SP9415 |
| Pitstone Hill | Buckinghamshire | 51.81°N 00.62°W | SP9514 |
| Pitt | Hampshire | 51.04°N 01.35°W | SU4528 |
| Pitt Court | Gloucestershire | 51.66°N 02.36°W | ST7596 |
| Pittentrail | Highland | 57.98°N 04.16°W | NC7202 |
| Pittenweem | Fife | 56.20°N 02.74°W | NO5402 |
| Pitteuchar | Fife | 56.17°N 03.16°W | NT2899 |
| Pittington | Durham | 54.79°N 01.50°W | NZ3244 |
| Pitton | Wiltshire | 51.07°N 01.70°W | SU2131 |
| Pitton | Swansea | 51.55°N 04.28°W | SS4287 |
| Pitts Hill | City of Stoke-on-Trent | 53.06°N 02.21°W | SJ8652 |
| Pittswood | Kent | 51.21°N 00.30°E | TQ6149 |
| Pittulie | Aberdeenshire | 57.69°N 02.08°W | NJ9567 |
| Pittville | Gloucestershire | 51.90°N 02.07°W | SO9523 |
| Pityme | Cornwall | 50.54°N 04.90°W | SW9476 |
| Pity Me | Durham | 54.79°N 01.59°W | NZ2645 |
| Pixham | Surrey | 51.23°N 00.32°W | TQ1750 |
| Pixham | Worcestershire | 52.13°N 02.23°W | SO8448 |
| Pixley | Herefordshire | 52.03°N 02.49°W | SO6638 |
| Pixley | Shropshire | 52.82°N 02.47°W | SJ6825 |
| Pizien Well | Kent | 51.25°N 00.39°E | TQ6753 |

== Pl ==
| Location | Locality | Coordinates (links to map & photo sources) | OS grid reference |
|---|---|---|---|
| Plaidy | Cornwall | 50.35°N 04.44°W | SX2653 |
| Plaidy | Aberdeenshire | 57.57°N 02.46°W | NJ7254 |
| Plain-an-Gwarry (Redruth) | Cornwall | 50.23°N 05.24°W | SW6942 |
| Plain-an-Gwarry (St Hilary) | Cornwall | 50.12°N 05.45°W | SW5331 |
| Plain Dealings | Pembrokeshire | 51.82°N 04.83°W | SN0518 |
| Plains | North Lanarkshire | 55.87°N 03.93°W | NS7966 |
| Plainsfield | Somerset | 51.11°N 03.15°W | ST1936 |
| Plain Spot | Nottinghamshire | 53.04°N 01.31°W | SK4650 |
| Plain Street | Cornwall | 50.56°N 04.86°W | SW9778 |
| Plaish | Shropshire | 52.56°N 02.70°W | SO5296 |
| Plaistow | West Sussex | 51.06°N 00.57°W | TQ0030 |
| Plaistow | Newham | 51.51°N 00.01°E | TQ4082 |
| Plaistow | Bromley | 51.41°N 00.01°E | TQ4070 |
| Plaistow Green | Essex | 51.92°N 00.61°E | TL8028 |
| Plaitford | Hampshire | 50.96°N 01.61°W | SU2719 |
| Plaitford Green | Hampshire | 50.98°N 01.60°W | SU2821 |
| Plank Lane | Wigan | 53.49°N 02.55°W | SD6300 |
| Plantation Bridge | Cumbria | 54.35°N 02.80°W | SD4896 |
| Plantationfoot | Dumfries and Galloway | 55.23°N 03.40°W | NY1194 |
| Plardiwick | Staffordshire | 52.77°N 02.28°W | SJ8120 |
| Plasau | Shropshire | 52.77°N 02.96°W | SJ3520 |
| Plas Berwyn | Denbighshire | 52.97°N 03.22°W | SJ1843 |
| Plas Coch | Wrexham | 53.05°N 03.01°W | SJ3251 |
| Plas Dinam | Powys | 52.49°N 03.44°W | SO0289 |
| Plas Gogerddan | Ceredigion | 52.42°N 04.01°W | SN6383 |
| Plashet | Newham | 51.53°N 00.03°E | TQ4184 |
| Plashett | Carmarthenshire | 51.75°N 04.50°W | SN2709 |
| Plasiolyn | Powys | 52.62°N 03.34°W | SJ0904 |
| Plas Meredydd | Powys | 52.56°N 03.21°W | SO1897 |
| Plasnewydd | Powys | 52.55°N 03.52°W | SN9796 |
| Plaster's Green | Bath and North East Somerset | 51.33°N 02.67°W | ST5360 |
| Plastow Green | Hampshire | 51.34°N 01.24°W | SU5361 |
| Platt | Kent | 51.28°N 00.32°E | TQ6257 |
| Platt Bridge | Wigan | 53.51°N 02.60°W | SD6002 |
| Platt Lane | Shropshire | 52.91°N 02.73°W | SJ5136 |
| Platts Common | Barnsley | 53.50°N 01.45°W | SE3601 |
| Platt's Heath | Kent | 51.21°N 00.67°E | TQ8750 |
| Plawsworth | Durham | 54.81°N 01.59°W | NZ2647 |
| Plaxtol | Kent | 51.25°N 00.29°E | TQ6053 |
| Playden | East Sussex | 50.95°N 00.71°E | TQ9121 |
| Playford | Suffolk | 52.07°N 01.22°E | TM2147 |
| Play Hatch | Oxfordshire | 51.47°N 00.93°W | SU7476 |
| Playing Place | Cornwall | 50.22°N 05.07°W | SW8141 |
| Playley Green | Gloucestershire | 51.97°N 02.35°W | SO7631 |
| Plealey | Shropshire | 52.64°N 02.85°W | SJ4206 |
| Pleamore Cross | Somerset | 50.95°N 03.25°W | ST1218 |
| Plean | Stirling | 56.06°N 03.88°W | NS8387 |
| Pleasant Valley | Pembrokeshire | 51.72°N 04.69°W | SN1406 |
| Pleasington | Lancashire | 53.72°N 02.54°W | SD6426 |
| Pleasley | Derbyshire | 53.17°N 01.25°W | SK5064 |
| Pleasleyhill | Nottinghamshire | 53.16°N 01.25°W | SK5063 |
| Pleck (Marnhull) | Dorset | 50.95°N 02.32°W | ST7717 |
| Pleck (or Little Ansty) | Dorset | 50.83°N 02.34°W | ST7604 |
| Pleck (Holwell) | Dorset | 50.88°N 02.42°W | ST7010 |
| Pleck | Walsall | 52.57°N 02.01°W | SO9997 |
| Pleckgate | Lancashire | 53.76°N 02.50°W | SD6730 |
| Pledgdon Green | Essex | 51.91°N 00.26°E | TL5626 |
| Pledwick | Wakefield | 53.63°N 01.50°W | SE3316 |
| Plemstall | Cheshire | 53.22°N 02.82°W | SJ4570 |
| Plenmeller | Northumberland | 54.96°N 02.45°W | NY7163 |
| Pleshey | Essex | 51.80°N 00.40°E | TL6614 |
| Plockton | Highland | 57.33°N 05.65°W | NG8033 |
| Plocrapool / Plocropol | Western Isles | 57.83°N 06.77°W | NG1793 |
| Plompton | North Yorkshire | 53.98°N 01.46°W | SE3553 |
| Plot Gate | Somerset | 51.08°N 02.65°W | ST5432 |
| Plot Street | Somerset | 51.12°N 02.64°W | ST5536 |
| Plough Hill | Warwickshire | 52.52°N 01.52°W | SP3292 |
| Plowden | Shropshire | 52.47°N 02.91°W | SO3887 |
| Ploxgreen | Shropshire | 52.62°N 02.94°W | SJ3603 |
| Pluckley | Kent | 51.17°N 00.74°E | TQ9245 |
| Pluckley Thorne | Kent | 51.16°N 00.73°E | TQ9144 |
| Plucks Gutter | Kent | 51.32°N 01.24°E | TR2663 |
| Plumbland | Cumbria | 54.73°N 03.32°W | NY1538 |
| Plumbley | Sheffield | 53.31°N 01.38°W | SK4180 |
| Plumford | Kent | 51.28°N 00.86°E | TR0058 |
| Plumley | Cheshire | 53.27°N 02.43°W | SJ7175 |
| Plump Hill | Gloucestershire | 51.85°N 02.49°W | SO6617 |
| Plumpton | East Sussex | 50.90°N 00.06°W | TQ3613 |
| Plumpton | Northamptonshire | 52.12°N 01.13°W | SP5948 |
| Plumpton | Cumbria | 54.72°N 02.79°W | NY4937 |
| Plumpton End | Northamptonshire | 52.09°N 00.95°W | SP7245 |
| Plumptonfoot | Cumbria | 54.74°N 02.80°W | NY4839 |
| Plumpton Green | East Sussex | 50.92°N 00.06°W | TQ3616 |
| Plumstead | Greenwich | 51.48°N 00.07°E | TQ4478 |
| Plumstead | Norfolk | 52.86°N 01.16°E | TG1334 |
| Plumstead Common | Greenwich | 51.47°N 00.08°E | TQ4577 |
| Plumstead Green | Norfolk | 52.86°N 01.14°E | TG1234 |
| Plumtree | Nottinghamshire | 52.88°N 01.09°W | SK6132 |
| Plumtree Green | Kent | 51.17°N 00.60°E | TQ8245 |
| Plumtree Park | Nottinghamshire | 52.87°N 01.09°W | SK6131 |
| Plungar | Leicestershire | 52.88°N 00.87°W | SK7633 |
| Plush | Dorset | 50.81°N 02.41°W | ST7102 |
| Plusha | Cornwall | 50.59°N 04.47°W | SX2580 |
| Plushabridge | Cornwall | 50.52°N 04.39°W | SX3072 |
| Plusterwine | Gloucestershire | 51.68°N 02.59°W | ST5999 |
| Plwmp | Ceredigion | 52.14°N 04.39°W | SN3652 |
| Plymouth | City of Plymouth | 50.38°N 04.15°W | SX4756 |
| Plympton | Devon | 50.38°N 04.06°W | SX5356 |
| Plymstock | Devon | 50.35°N 04.09°W | SX5153 |
| Plymtree | Devon | 50.80°N 03.34°W | ST0502 |
