= Plas Newydd =

Plas Newydd (meaning "new hall") may refer to several buildings and places in Wales:

- Plas Newydd, Powys, a location in Carno community
- Plas Newydd (Anglesey), a historic house and garden on Anglesey
- Plas Newydd, Llangollen, a historic house and garden in Llangollen, Denbighshire
- Plas Newydd, Usk, a historic house in Usk, Monmouthshire

== See also ==
- Plasnewydd, an electoral ward and former community in Cardiff, Wales
