= Plec =

Plec may refer to:

- Plec, Poland
- Julie Plec (born 1972), American television producer, writer and director
- Plecostomus, several species from the catfish family Loricariidae
- Plectin, a protein
- Plectrum, a device for plucking or strumming a stringed instrument

== See also ==
- Pleck (disambiguation)
