= Oyne railway station =

Former railway station in Scotland

Oyne

General information
- Location: Oyne, Aberdeenshire; Scotland
- Coordinates: 57.3225°N 2.5434°W
- Grid reference: NJ672258
- Platforms: 2

Other information
- Status: Disused

History
- Original company: Great North of Scotland Railway
- Pre-grouping: Great North of Scotland Railway

Key dates
- 20 September 1854: Opened
- 6 May 1968: Closed
Location

Oyne railway station is a former railway station that served the small village of Oyne, Aberdeenshire.

== History ==
Oyne station was built by the Great North of Scotland railway on its line from Aberdeen to Keith. Like most stations on the line, it was opened in 1854. It was closed like most intermediate stops on the line in 1968 by the Beeching cuts.

== Previous services ==
Preceding station	Historical railways	Following station
Pitcaple; Line open; Station closed	Great North of Scotland Railway; GNoSR Main Line	Buchanstone; Line open; Station closed
