= Aberdeen Society of Architects =

The Aberdeen Society of Architects (ASA) is a chapter of the Royal Incorporation of Architects in Scotland, and represents some 200 Chartered Architects in Aberdeen, Aberdeenshire and Moray. ASA's main objective is to promote the interests of architects and architecture within its area. Currently, 12 local Architects are on the Society's council.

== History ==
ASA was founded in 1898 by a group of architects in Aberdeen. It was formed as an institute to represent and support these architects, to provide lectures and educational trips, and to further the objectives of the profession as a whole. ASA's first president was James Souttar, who served as the chair from 1898 to 1900. Souttar was followed by Arthur Clyne, who served from 1900–1904 and 1909–1913 then retired in 1914. In 1907, ASA had 23 members. The membership more than doubled after the War.

== Society logo ==
The logo represents Aberdeen's Kings College Chapel, with its steeple in the form of an imperial crown. It is the only remaining building of the original college. Although the society was founded in 1898, the logo features the year 1916, in reference to the year in which chartered status was achieved.

== Annual Design Awards ==
The Society runs an annual awards programme, the ASA Design Awards, to recognise outstanding architecture in Aberdeen and Aberdeenshire. Previous winners have included the Terrace Cafe and Bar at His Majesty's Theatre, Aberdeen (2023) and the Aberdeen Art Gallery (2020).
