= James Souttar =

Scottish architect

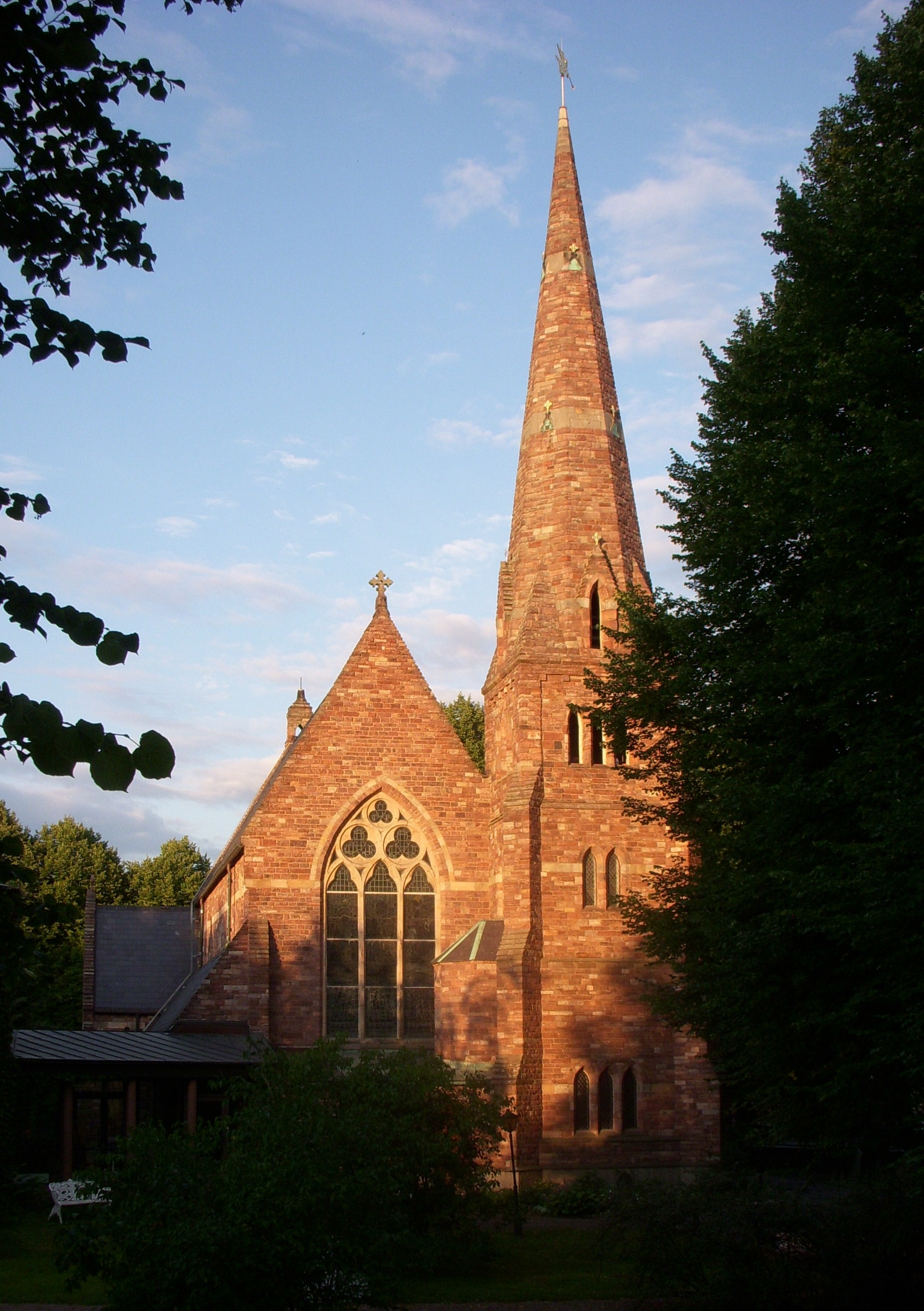
The English Church in Stockholm

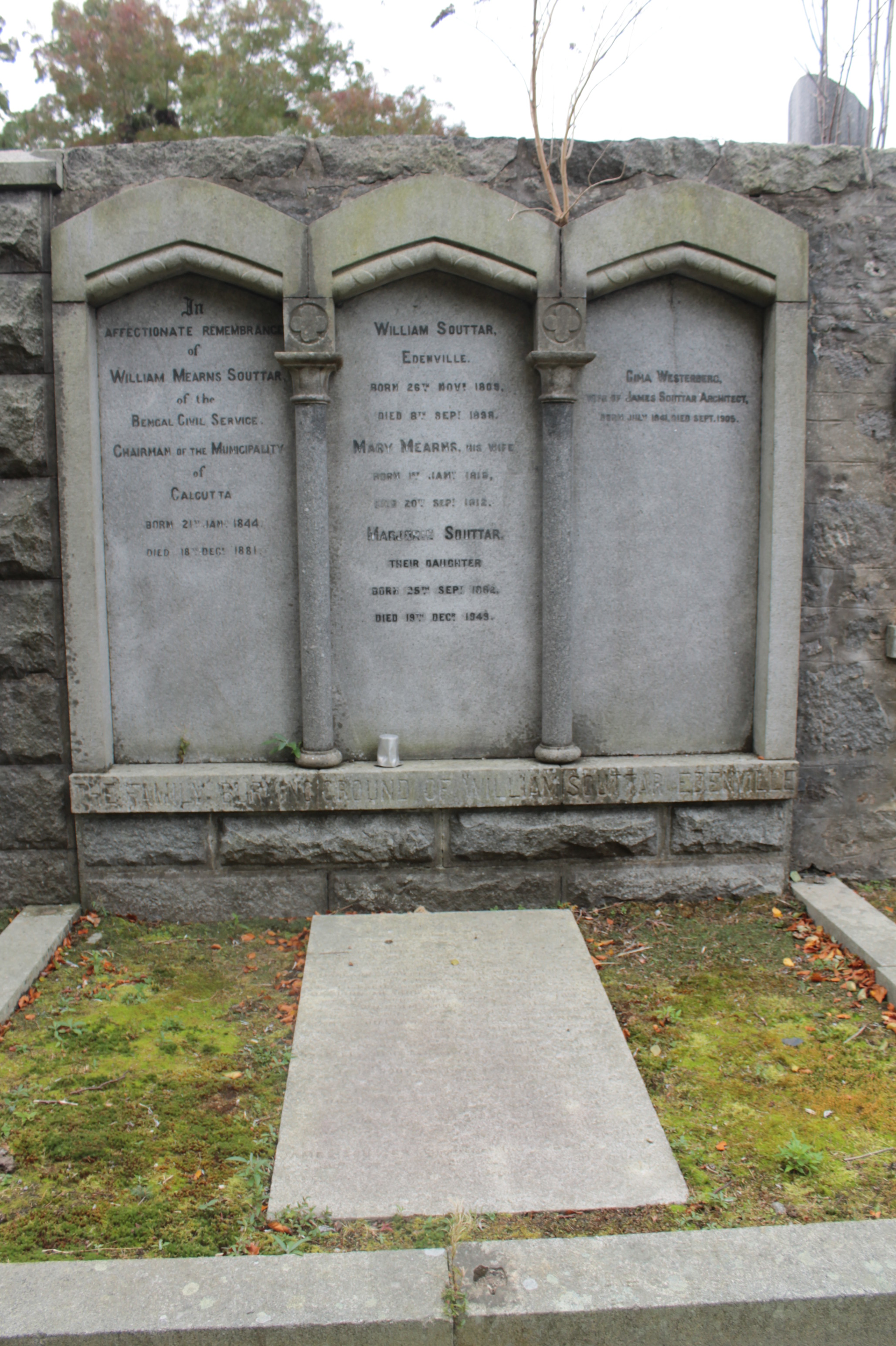
The Souttar grave, Nellfield Cemetery

James Souttar FRIBA (11 February 1840, in London – 22 April 1922, in Aberdeen) was a Scottish architect.

== Life ==
The son of William Souttar (1805–1838) of Edenville in Aberdeen, and his wife Mary Mearns, Souttar worked in Sweden from 1863 to 1866, first at Gothenburg (in 1863) and later at Stockholm (1863–1866). His works there include St Peter and St Sigfrid's Church in Stockholm, known locally as the "English Church", which was moved, stone by stone, to its present location in the Östermalm area of the city in 1913.

Another building that takes place in Souttar's portfolio was the St. Nicholas Congregational Church in Aberdeen. Records say the building was erected in 1865, whilst the circular stained glass windows which are still intact say 1869. The building in 2001 was in a deteriorating, derelict state when Aberdeen bar and nightclub operators, The Epic Group bought the building. It is now a nightclub called "The Priory."

In 1898, Souttar became the founding president of The Aberdeen Society of Architects.

He is buried with his wife Gina Westerberg of Sweden, and his parents, in Nellfield Cemetery in Aberdeen.
