= Insch railway station =

Railway station in Aberdeenshire, Scotland

Insch Scottish Gaelic: Innis
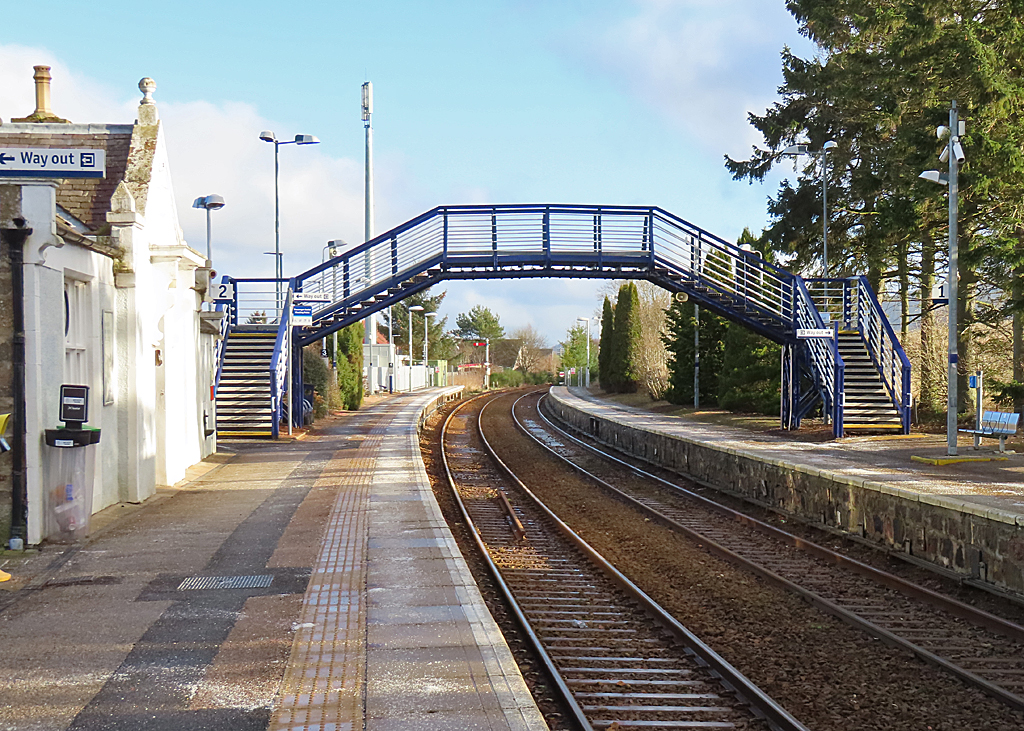
- View from Insch railway station looking east towards Inverurie (2025)

General information
- Location: Insch, Aberdeenshire; Scotland
- Coordinates: 57.3374°N 2.6168°W
- Grid reference: NJ629276
- Managed by: ScotRail
- Platforms: 2

Other information
- Station code: INS

History
- Pre-grouping: Great North of Scotland Railway

Key dates
- 20 September 1854: Opened

Passengers
- 2020/21: ▼11,038
- 2021/22: ▲42,090
- 2022/23: ▲52,348
- 2023/24: ▲61,436
- 2024/25: ▲66,866
Location
Notes
- Passenger statistics from the Office of Rail and Road

Insch railway station is a railway station serving the village of Insch, Aberdeenshire, Scotland. The station is managed by ScotRail and is on the Aberdeen to Inverness Line, between Inverurie and Huntly, 27 miles 47 chains (44.4 km) from Aberdeen.

== History ==
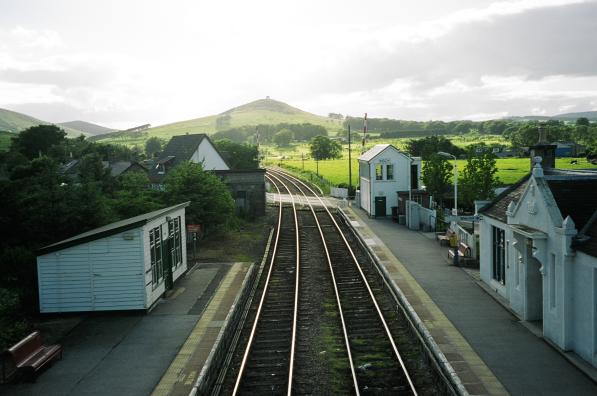
Looking west from the footbridge

The station was opened by the Great North of Scotland Railway on 20 September 1854, on the route from Aberdeen to Keith.

In 2019, the platforms were extended to a length of 160 m (520 ft) as part of a series of improvements to the Aberdeen to Inverness line.

== Facilities ==
The former station building accommodates the Insch Connection Museum, which records the history of the railway in Insch and the local region. The station has two platforms, a signal box and a level crossing at its northern end. Both platforms are equipped with waiting rooms and benches. A help point is located on platform 2, whilst there is a ticket machine on platform 1, the latter of which is adjacent to the car park and some bike racks. Only platform 1 has step-free access - a footbridge connects the two platforms, and is the only way to get to platform 2.

== Passenger volume ==
Passenger Volume at Insch
	2004–05	2005–06	2006–07	2007–08	2008–09	2009–10	2010–11	2011–12	2012–13	2013–14	2014–15	2015–16	2016–17	2017–18	2018–19	2019–20	2020–21	2021–22	2022–23	2023–24	2024–25
Entries and exits	62,261	66,432	65,823	72,644	79,466	82,706	86,854	93,712	107,122	113,922	122,404	118,378	98,140	88,362	69,952	57,690	11,038	42,090	52,348	61,436	66,866

The statistics cover twelve month periods that start in April.

== Services ==
There is a basic two-hourly frequency in each directions (with peak extras), to Inverness via Elgin northbound and Aberdeen southbound (12 trains southbound, 11 northbound). The first departure to Aberdeen each weekday and Saturday continues south to Edinburgh Waverley. On Sundays there are five trains each way.

Preceding station	National Rail	Following station
Inverurie	ScotRail; Aberdeen to Inverness Line	Huntly
	Historical railways	
Buchanstone; Line open; Station closed	Great North of Scotland Railway; GNoSR Main Line	Wardhouse; Line open; Station closed

== Bibliography ==
- Butt, R. V. J. (October 1995). The Directory of Railway Stations: details every public and private passenger station, halt, platform and stopping place, past and present (1st ed.). Sparkford: Patrick Stephens Ltd. ISBN 978-1-85260-508-7. OCLC 60251199. OL 11956311M.
- Jowett, Alan (March 1989). Jowett's Railway Atlas of Great Britain and Ireland: From Pre-Grouping to the Present Day (1st ed.). Sparkford: Patrick Stephens Ltd. ISBN 978-1-85260-086-0. OCLC 22311137.
- Quick, Michael (2022). Railway Passenger Stations in Great Britain: A Chronology (PDF) (5th ed.). London: Railway and Canal Historical Society.
