= Nellfield Cemetery =

Victorian cemetery in Aberdeen City, Scotland

Coordinates: 57°08′20″N 2°06′58″W

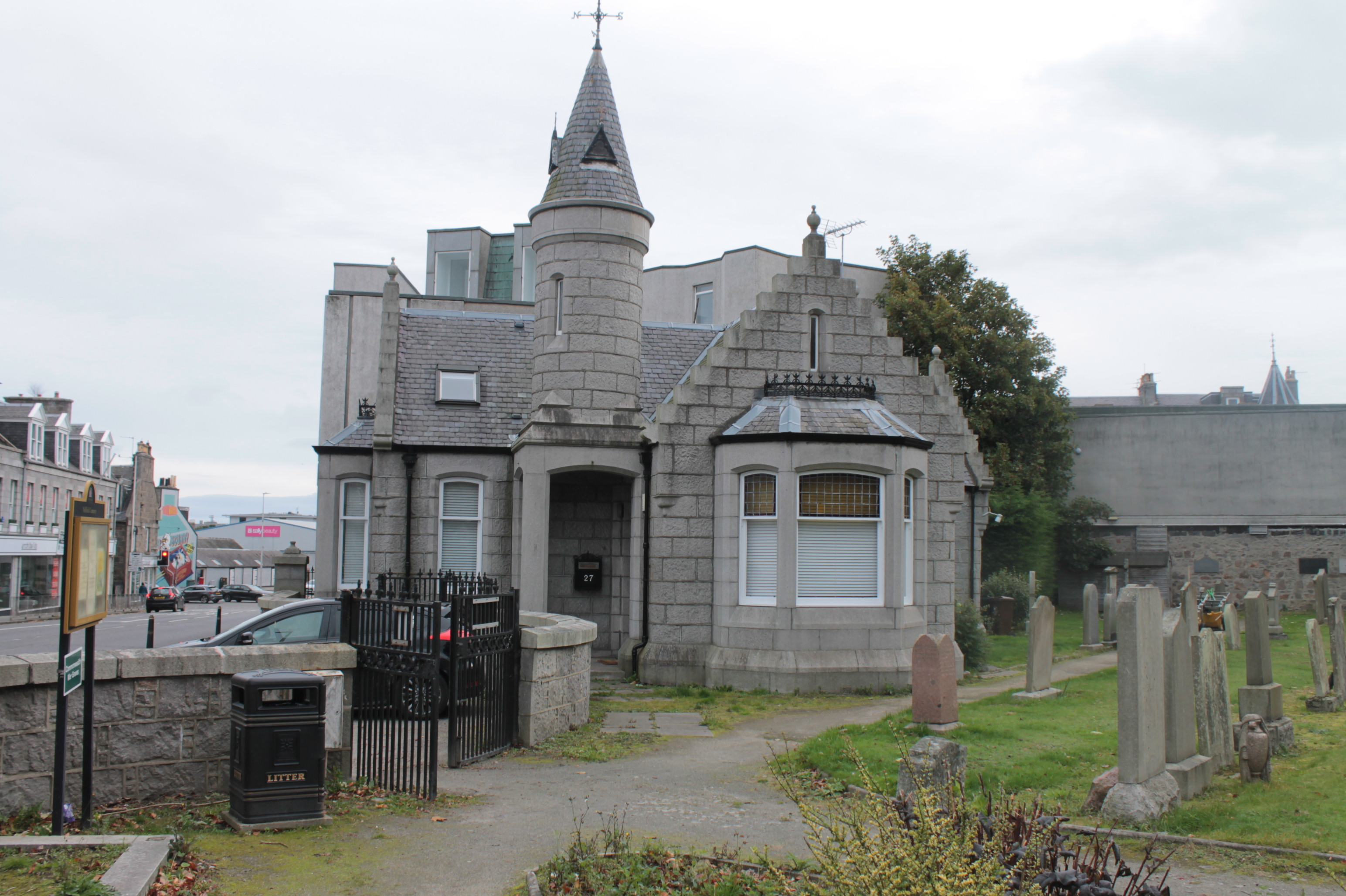
Cemetery Lodge, Nellfield Cemetery

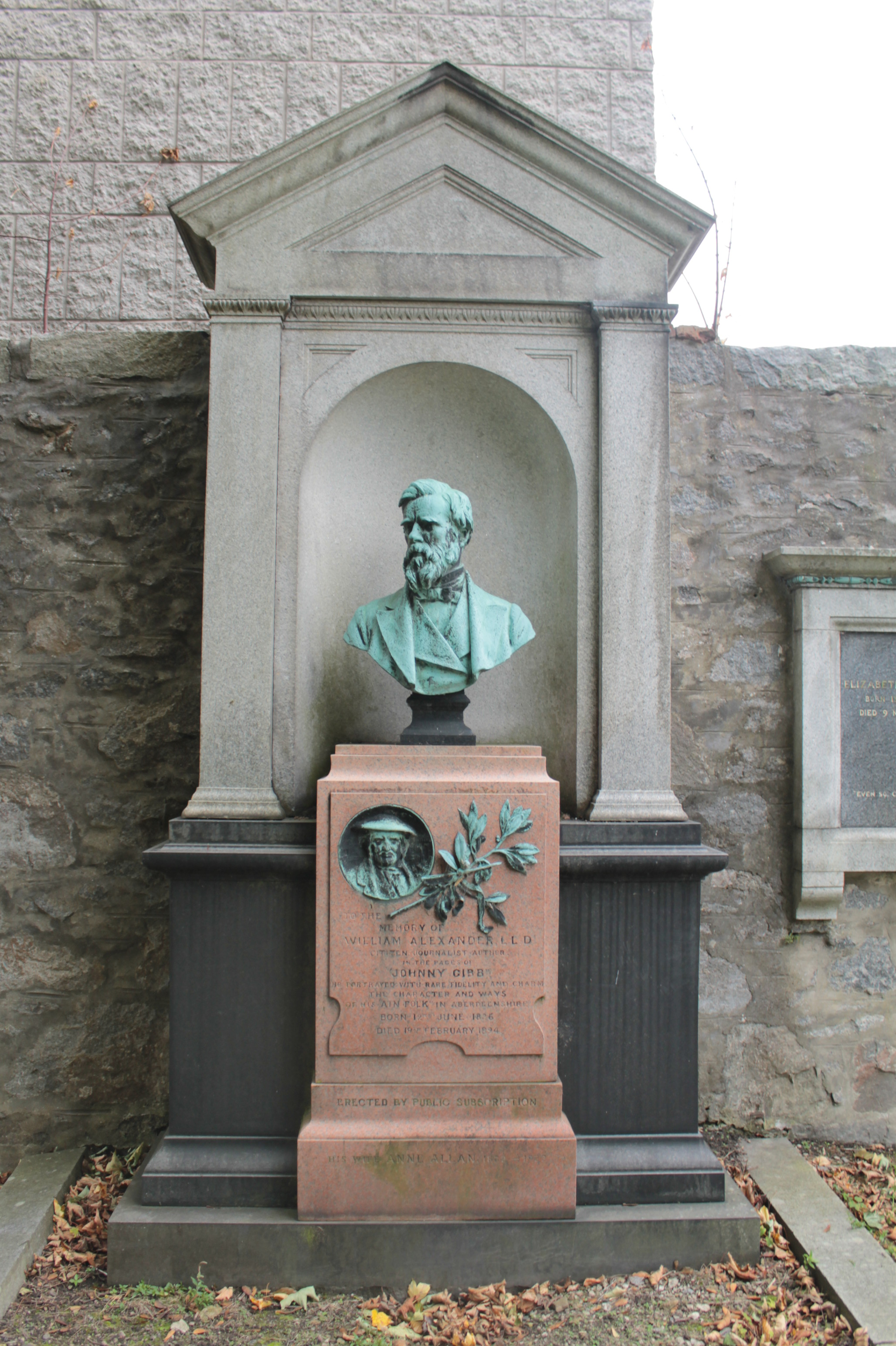
The grave of William Alexander in Nellfield Cemetery

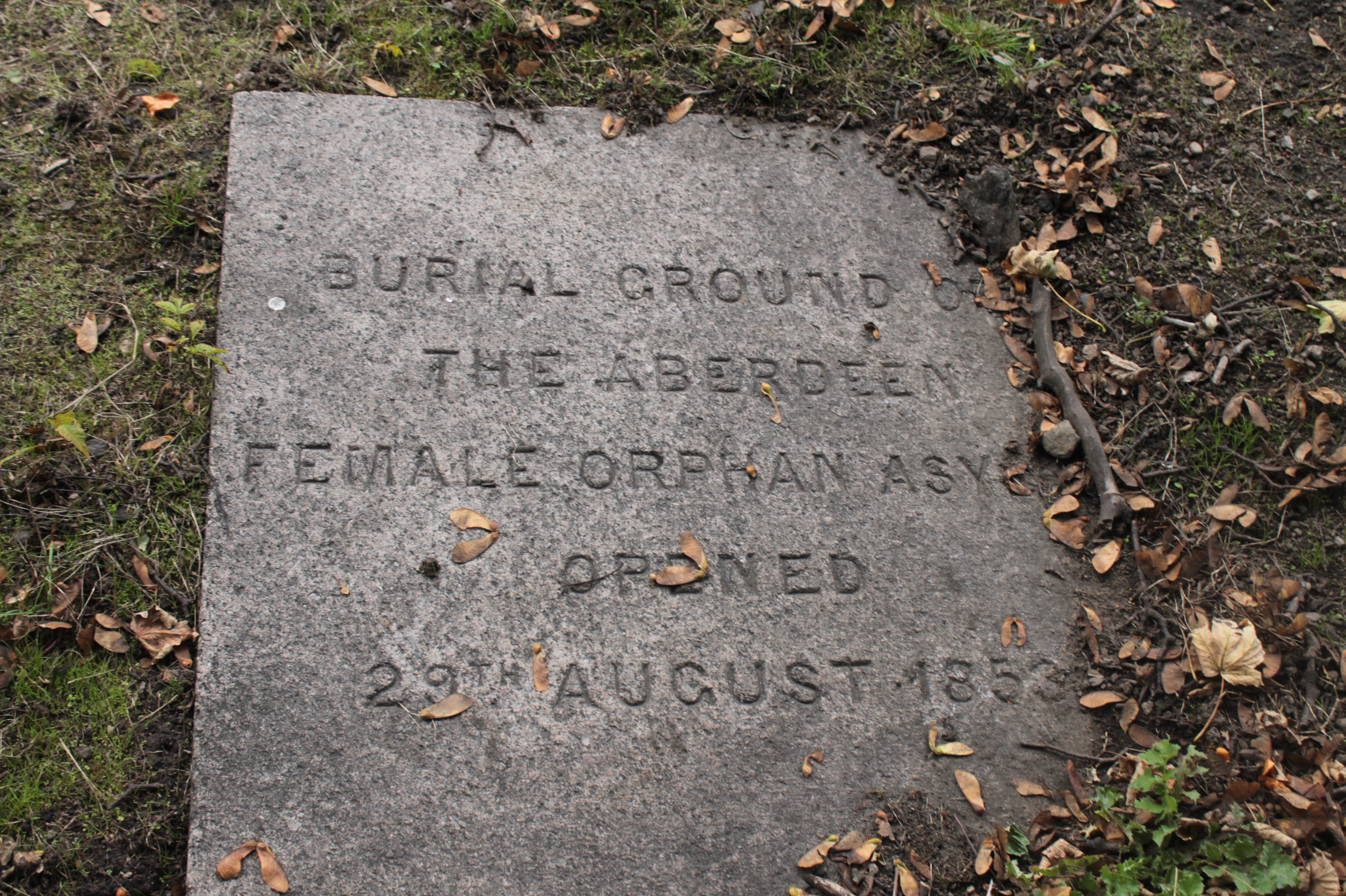
Mass grave for orphans, Nellfield Cemetery

Nellfield Cemetery is a Victorian cemetery in south Aberdeen, Scotland. It lies on the Great Western Road (A93), near its eastmost end.

== History ==
The cemetery was formerly the site of Nellfield House and its garden. It was last owned by the Gibbon sisters who had inherited it from their uncle, Alexander Martin. The cemetery dates from 1834 and for many years house and cemetery co-existed, with the cemetery limited to the northern section of the garden.. The house was demolished sometime after 1860 and in 1871 the cemetery was extended. The cemetery was extended again in 1881. The cemetery lodge and entrance gates were designed by Aberdeen architect James Souttar in 1881.

It contains 46 Commonwealth War Graves.

The cemetery was taken into the control of Aberdeen City Council in 1979. The Council restored the cemetery and received a commendation from the Civic Trust for this work in 1982. In 1985 the cemetery and monuments were designated as a listed building.

== Burials of note ==
- William Alexander (journalist and author)
- Alexander Duthie of Duthie Park
- Peter Esslemont MP and Lord Provost of Aberdeen
- David Gray FRSE
- George Jamieson, Lord Provost 1874–1880
- Sir Alexander Lyon, Lord Provost 1905–1908
- Charles McDonald, "father of the granite industry"
- Peter Milne (musician)
- Orphan grave, mass grave for female orphans
- John Thomson Rennie
- James Souttar, architect
- George Washington Wilson photographer
