= Pleck (disambiguation) =

Pleck is in Walsall.

Pleck may also refer to:

- Pleck, Hazelbury Bryan, Dorset
- Pleck, Holwell, Dorset
  - Pleck Green, Holwell, Dorset
- Pleck, Marnhull, Dorset
- Pleck, a hamlet in Batcombe, Dorset
- Pleck (or Little Ansty), part of Ansty, Dorset in Hilton, Dorset
