= Buchanstone railway station =

Former railway station in Aberdeenshire, Scotland

Buchanstone
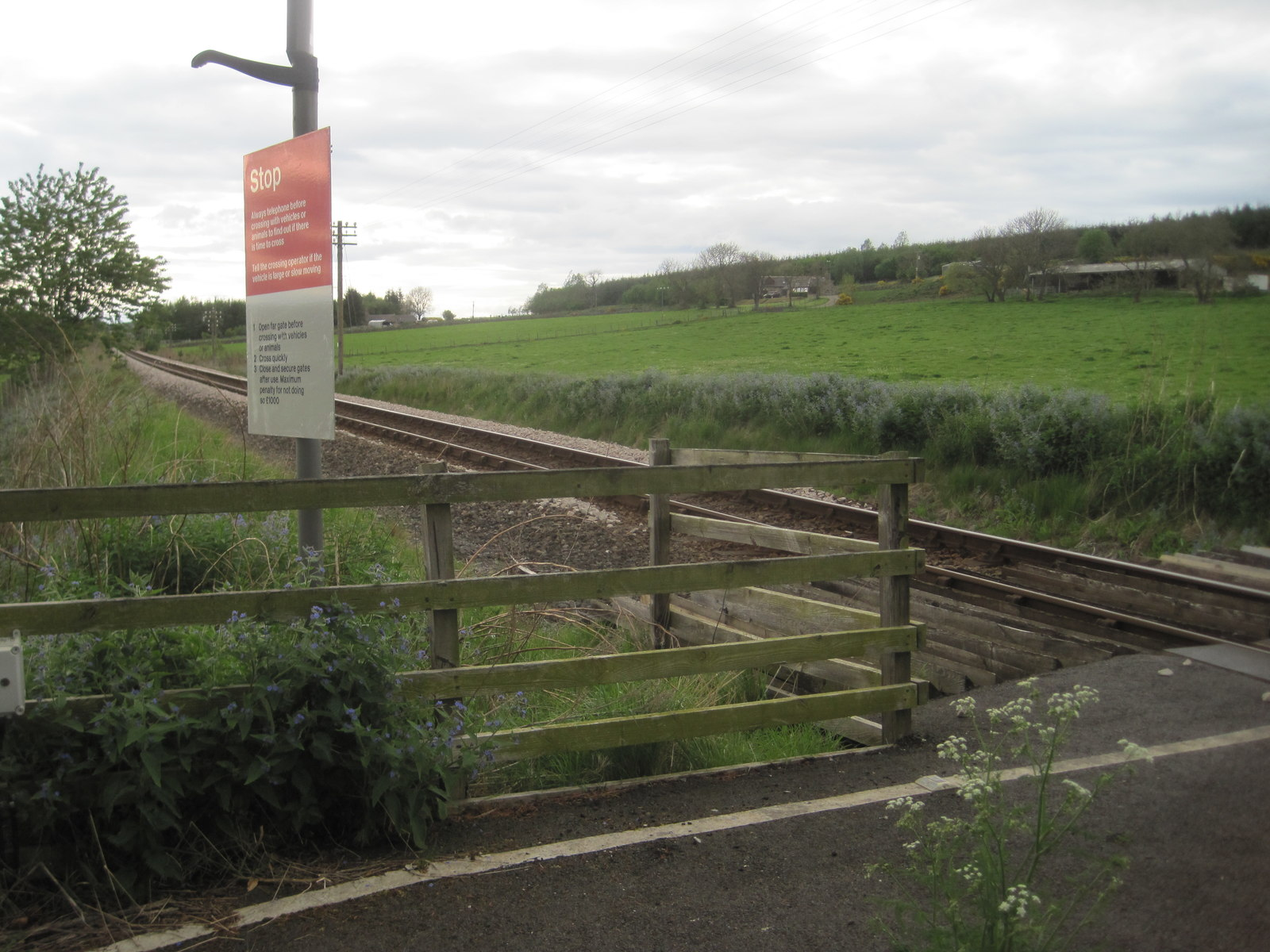
- The site of the station in 2017

General information
- Location: Buchanstone, Aberdeenshire; Scotland
- Coordinates: 57.3242°N 2.5679°W
- Grid reference: NJ659261

Other information
- Status: Disused

History
- Original company: Great North of Scotland Railway
- Pre-grouping: Great North of Scotland Railway

Key dates
- 1 December 1854: Opened
- 1 October 1866: Closed
Location

Buchanstone railway station is a former railway station in Aberdeenshire. On the Great North of Scotland Railway, the station was on the north side of the track. It was opened in 1854 and closed to passenger traffic in 1866. The building was demolished before 1901 and nothing visible remains. The railway line is still in use as the Aberdeen to Inverness Line.

== Previous services ==
Preceding station	Historical railways	Following station
Oyne; Line open; Station closed	Great North of Scotland Railway; GNoSR Main Line	Insch; Line and Station open
