= William Alexander (journalist and author) =

Scottish journalist and author

- Born: 12 June 1826; Chapel of Garioch, Aberdeenshire, Scotland
- Died: 19 February 1894 (aged 67); Aberdeen, Scotland
- Occupations: Journalist and Author
- Notable work: Johnny Gibb of Gushetneuk
- Movement: Radical Liberal, Land Reform

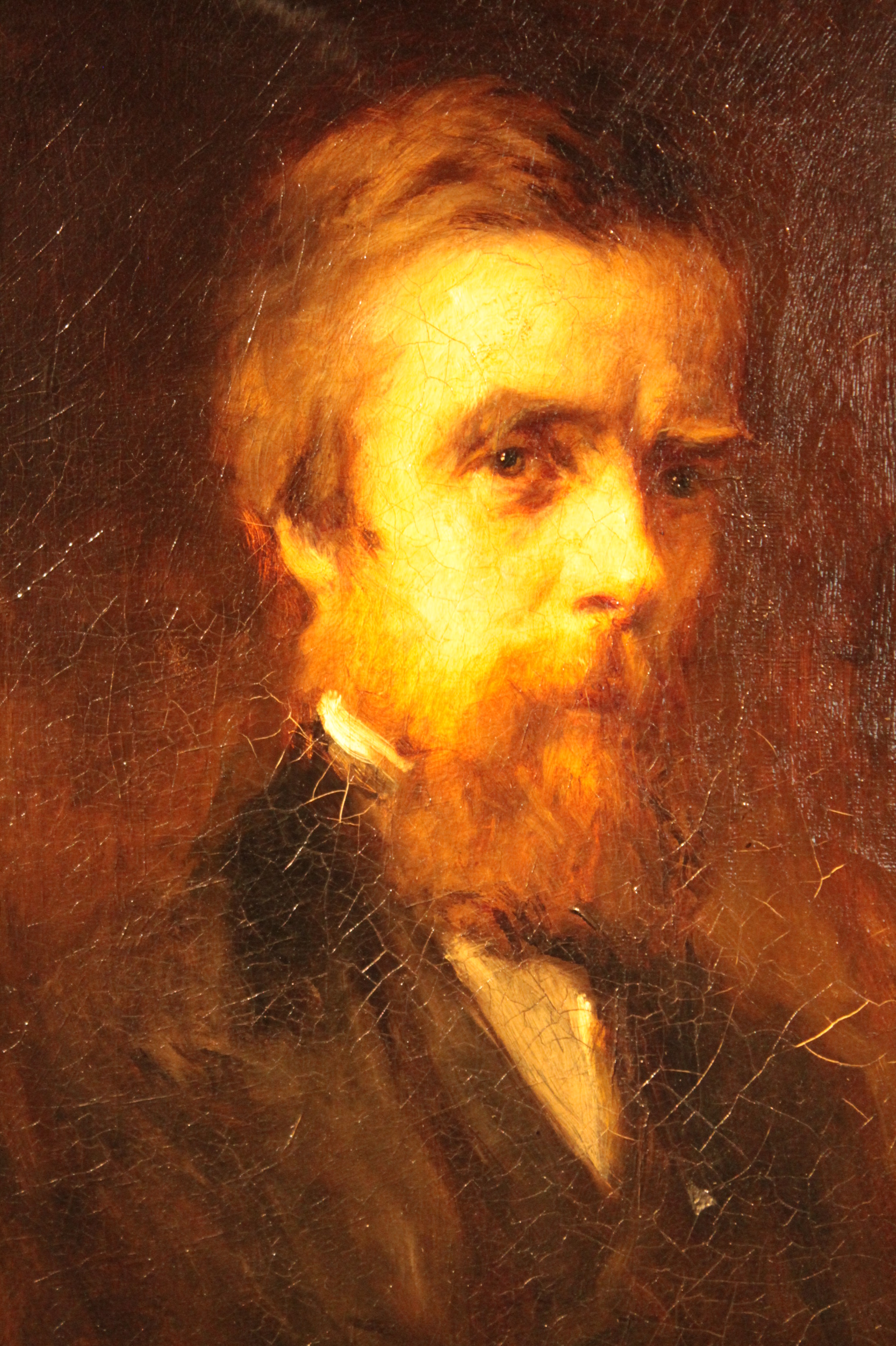
William Alexander by George Reid 1877

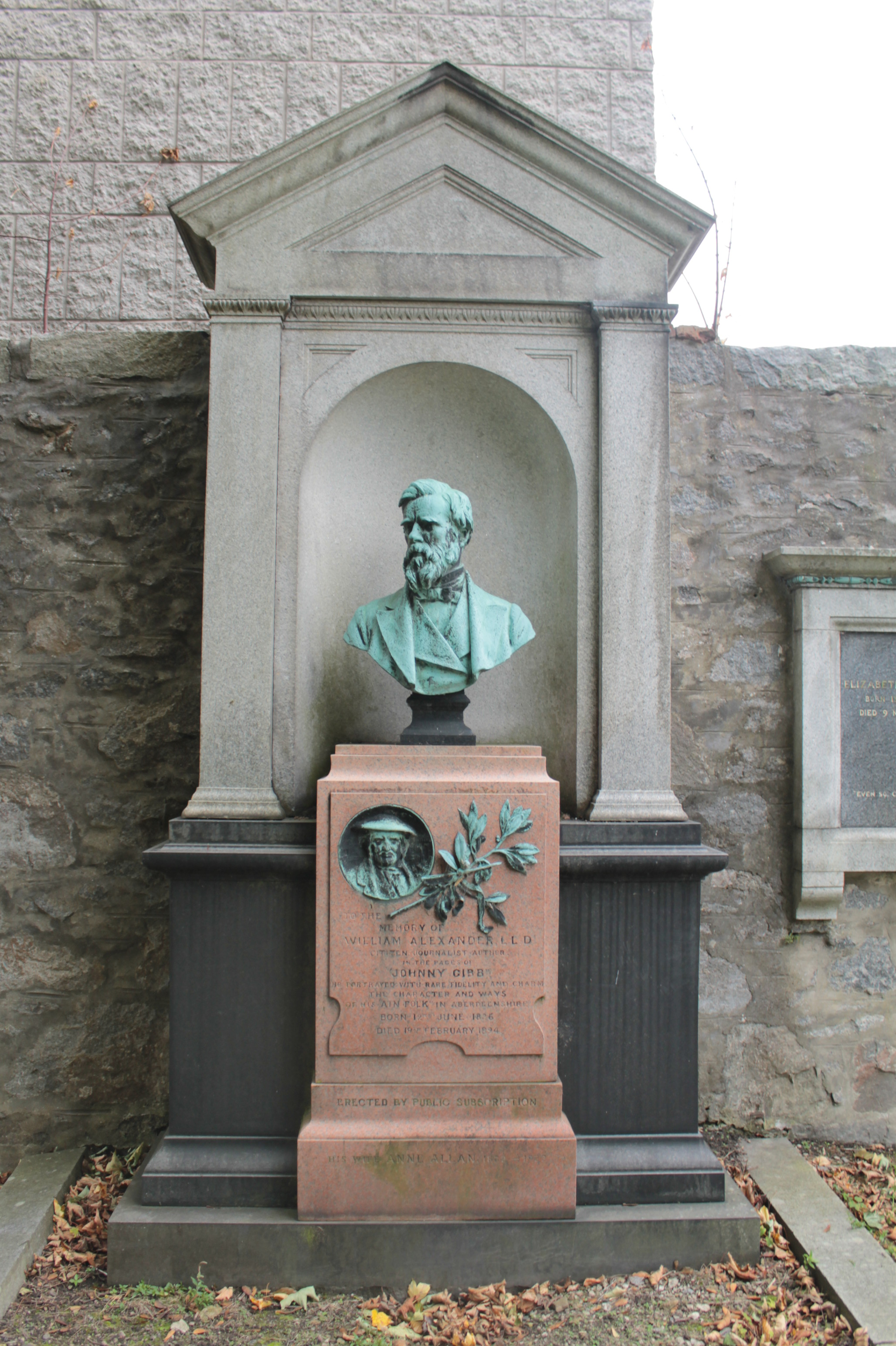
The grave of William Alexander in Nellfield Cemetery

William Alexander LLD (12 June 1826 – 19 February 1894) was a Scottish journalist and author. His most widely known novel Johnny Gibb of Gushetneuk, paints a vivid picture of economic and social relations in a rural parish in Aberdeenshire during the 1840s, against the background of the Disruption in the Scottish Kirk.

== Early life ==
William Alexander was born at Chapel of Garioch, at the foot of Bennachie, in Aberdeenshire, the eldest son of James Alexander (1789–1856), a blacksmith and farmer, and his wife Anne Wilson (1802–1889). He was brought up on the farm of Damhead, Pitcaple and attended school in Daviot. He had intended to become a farmer, but the loss of a leg in an accident in his early twenties ended that prospect. While recovering, he read a lot, taught himself Latin, learned shorthand and began to write poems and stories for local periodicals.

== Career in journalism ==
Alexander established himself as a writer with the help of the Mutual Instruction movement which flourished in North-East Scotland at this time under the direction of William McCombie of Cairnballoch, farmer, philosopher, economist and newspaper editor, who gave him a job as reporter and chief clerk of the Aberdeen Free Press in the autumn of 1852. Alexander eventually succeeded McCombie as editor of the paper, and went on to become one of the leading professional journalists in Victorian Scotland. Politically, he was a radical, supporting land reform, the abolition of hereditary privileges and Irish Home Rule. His writing championed the crofters and small farmers of Aberdeenshire.

Alexander's first substantial piece of journalism was a series entitled Sketches of Rural Life in Aberdeenshire which began in the North of Scotland Gazette on 31 December 1852 and continued in the Aberdeen Free Press until December of the following year.

His assiduous reporting on the cattle disease rinderpest after it reached Aberdeenshire in June 1865 assisted the development of effective local measures to limit its spread.

Alexander's series of essays on The Aberdeenshire Crofter, published in the Aberdeen Free Press in 1886, were written in support of the campaign by the Scottish Land Reform Alliance (SLRA) to have the provisions of the Crofters' Holdings Bill extended to Aberdeenshire and the other north-eastern counties.

Political tensions developed between the proprietors of the Aberdeen Free Press. Alexander's younger brother Henry, who became editor of the Daily Free Press, took a Liberal-Unionist position on the Irish Question, and the brothers became bitterly estranged.

Alexander was created Vice-President of the Institute of Journalists in recognition of his work.

== Fiction ==
Alexander was a prolific novelist of wide thematic range and considerable variety of style, from austere realism at one end of the scale, to mellow social comedy at the other. His works were serialised in popular newspapers. He consciously avoided the book as a publication vehicle. The speech of his characters was rendered in an orthography which sought to convey the sound system of Lowland Scots in Central Aberdeenshire in the middle of the nineteenth century. William Donaldson has placed him in the Realist tradition.

The series Sketches of Rural Life in Aberdeenshire ran in the Aberdeen Free Press during 1853. The Authentic History of Peter Grundie appeared in the Penny Free Press in 1855, and is the earliest novel of substance to be written specifically for publication in a Scottish newspaper. There followed The Laird of Drammochdyle in 1865, Ravenshowe and the Residenters Therein in 1867, and Johnny Gibb of Gushetneuk in 1869.

The Laird of Drammochdyle and his Contemporaries was published serially in the Tuesday edition of the Aberdeen Free Press shortly after the paper went bi-weekly in 1865. It is a study of changing power relationships in which representatives of traditional elites are destroyed by the rising capitalist bourgeoisie. Its portrayal of the social impacts of Scotland's burgeoning brewing and distilling industries reflects Alexander's sympathy with the temperance movement.

Johnny Gibb of Gushetneuk was first published as a serial in the Aberdeen Free Press between 28 September 1869 and 20 December 1870. It was published in book form in Aberdeen in 1871. William Donaldson has argued that it is property, and the abuse of power that flows from it, that is the ultimate concern of the novel. Ian Carter has described it as "a fiercely democratic novel about rural Scotland that is rooted in contemporary social and political struggle."

Alexander's later short stories, Mary Malcolmson's Wee Maggie, Baubie Huie's Bastart Geet, Francie Herregerie's Sharger Laddie and Couper Sandy, in the series Life Among my Ain Folk (1875), show the harsh consequences of economic and social change for cottars, labourers and small tenant farmers.

His last full novel, My Uncle the Baillie (1876) was published serially in Aberdeen's Herald and Weekly Free Press between 2 December 1876 and 15 May 1877. It deals with burgh politics in the city of Greyness (a thinly disguised Aberdeen) from the 1840s to the 1870s, casting a jaundiced eye on the Victorian ideal of Civic Virtue.

== Personal life ==
Having taken on the responsibility of supporting his late father's young family, Alexander was married on 22 May 1867, aged forty one, to schoolteacher Anne Allan. They had no children. William was awarded an honorary degree of Doctor of Law by the University of Aberdeen and has a plaque to his memory on his house at 3 Belvidere Street, Aberdeen. His ancestry and family history is published in The Alexanders of Bourtie, 1690-1886.

He lived his final years a 3 Belvidere Street in Aberdeen.

He died on 19 February 1894 and was buried in Nellfield Cemetery in Aberdeen. The grave lies against the east wall not far from the main north entrance.

== Bibliography ==
- The Laird of Drammochdyle and his Contemporaries: or, Random Sketches done in Outline with a Burnt Stick, Aberdeen University Press, 1986, ISBN 0-08-034520-4
- Rural Life in Victorian Aberdeenshire, edited by Ian Carter, The Mercat Press, Edinburgh, ISBN 1-873644-06-X
- Johnny Gibb of Gushetneuk in the Parish of Pyketillim, Tuckwell Press Ltd., East Linton, 1995, ISBN 1-89841-044-5
- My Uncle the Baillie, Tuckwell Press Ltd., East Lothian, 1995, ISBN 9781898410157
- Notes and Sketches Illustrative of Northern Rural Life in the Eighteenth Century, Robin Callendar, Finzean, 1981, ISBN 0907184022
