= George Washington Wilson =

Scottish photographer

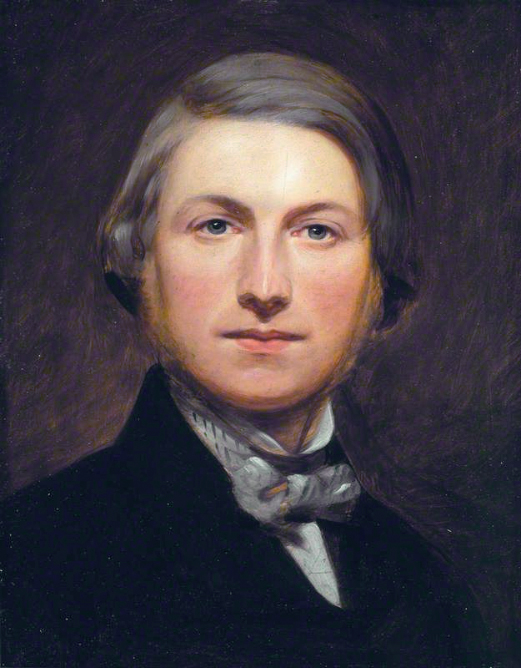
- Self portrait
- Born: 7 February 1823; Alvah, Banffshire
- Died: 9 March 1893 (aged 70); Aberdeen, Scotland

George Washington Wilson (7 February 1823 – 9 March 1893) was a pioneering Scottish photographer. In 1849, he began a career as a portrait miniaturist, switching to portrait photography in 1852. He received a contract to photograph the Royal Family, working for Queen Victoria and Prince Albert. He pioneered various techniques for outdoor photography and the mass production of photographic prints as he gradually began to largely do landscape photography in the 1860s. By 1864, he claimed to have sold over half a million copies.

== Biography ==
Wilson was born in 1823 in Alvah, Banffshire. After studying art in Edinburgh and London, Wilson returned to his native city of Aberdeen in 1849 and established a business as a portrait miniaturist catering to the wealthy families of the North East of Scotland. After some years of mediocre success, Wilson ventured into portrait photography in 1852, setting up a portrait studio with John Hay in 25 Crown Street in Aberdeen. From there, aided by his well-developed technical and commercial acumen and a contract to photograph the Royal Family while documenting the building of Balmoral Castle in 1854–1855, he established himself as one of Scotland's premier photographers working for Queen Victoria and Prince Albert in 1860.

Pioneering the development of techniques for photography outside of the studio and the mass production of photographic prints, he moved increasingly from portraiture to landscape photography in the 1860s. He also produced stereoscopic pictures whose main characteristic was that exposures were very short. By 1864 he claimed to have sold over half a million prints.

At the time of his death in 1893 (he had handed over the business to his sons, Charles, Louis and John Hay Wilson in 1888) the firm employed 40 staff and was one of the largest publishers of photographic prints in the world, competing with James Valentine, who was also a prolific photographer, with a large company in Dundee. The business survived until 1908, when it was wound up at auction.

He died in 1893, aged 70, and was buried in Nellfield Cemetery in Aberdeen.

== Collection ==
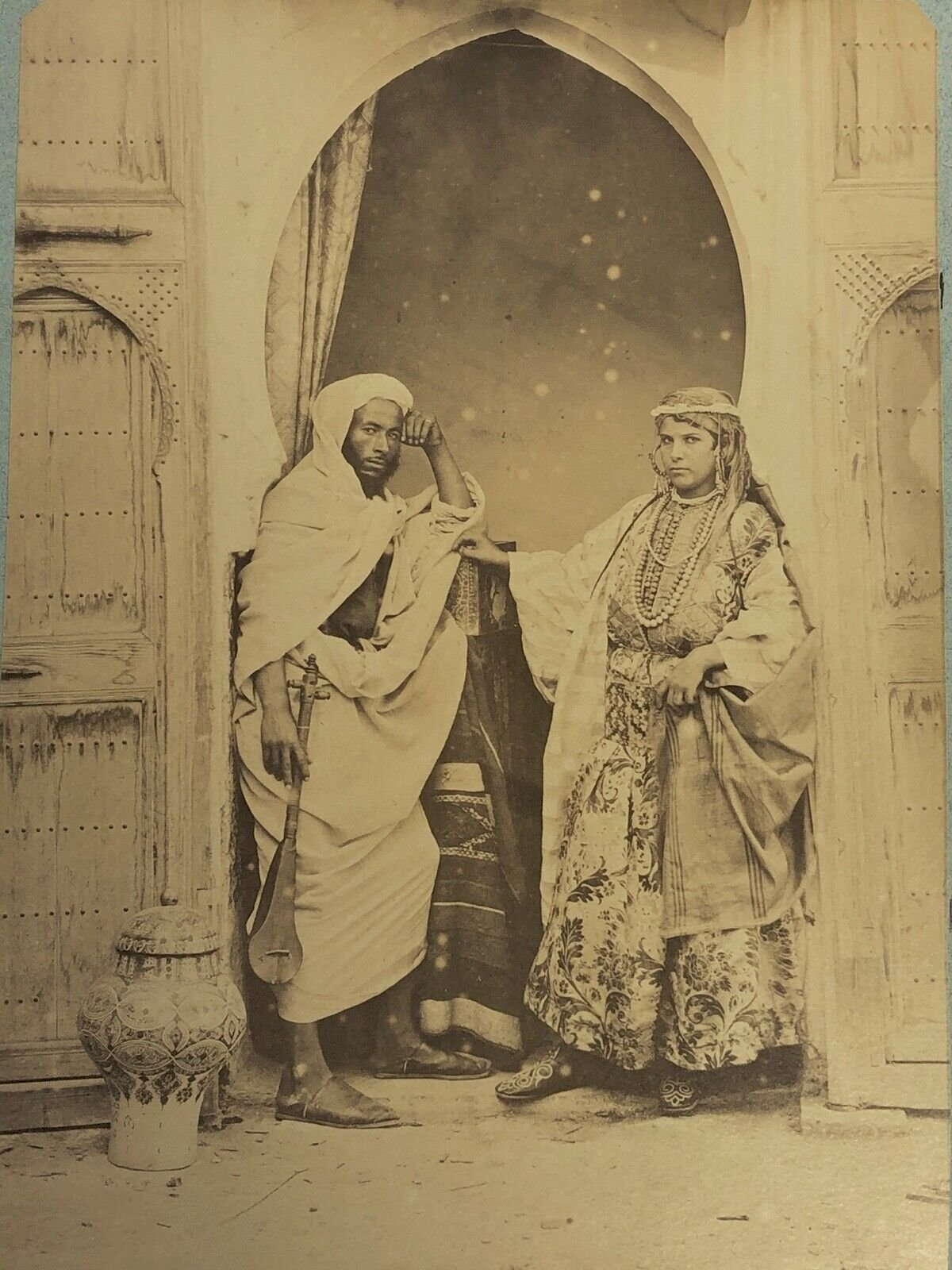
Moroccan couple from Tangier by George Washington Wilson - 1872

Over 40,000 of Wilson's photographic glass plates survive, largely due to the meticulous washing and chemical treatments he insisted on. Aberdeen University is in possession of some 38,000 of these, which were donated by an Aberdeen photographer, the late Archie Strachan, in 1958. They date from the late 1850s down to the early years of the 20th century and cover not only Aberdeen and the North East of Scotland but the whole of Scotland and most of England, as well as parts of Wales and Northern Ireland, Gibraltar, Morocco including Tangier, the South of Spain, and (especially) colonial South Africa and Australia. A further 500+ photographic glass plates can be found in Aberdeen City Council Archives, Gallery and Museums Collection.

From about 1870 onwards Wilson relied increasingly on others to add to his stock. Thus all of the Mediterranean Sea views and many of the English and Scottish series are the work of staff photographers, or were commissioned by the company from photographic firms elsewhere in the UK; and the Australian and South African images were added to the firm's stock in the 1890s by Charles Wilson (George's son) and staff photographers such as Fred Hardie.

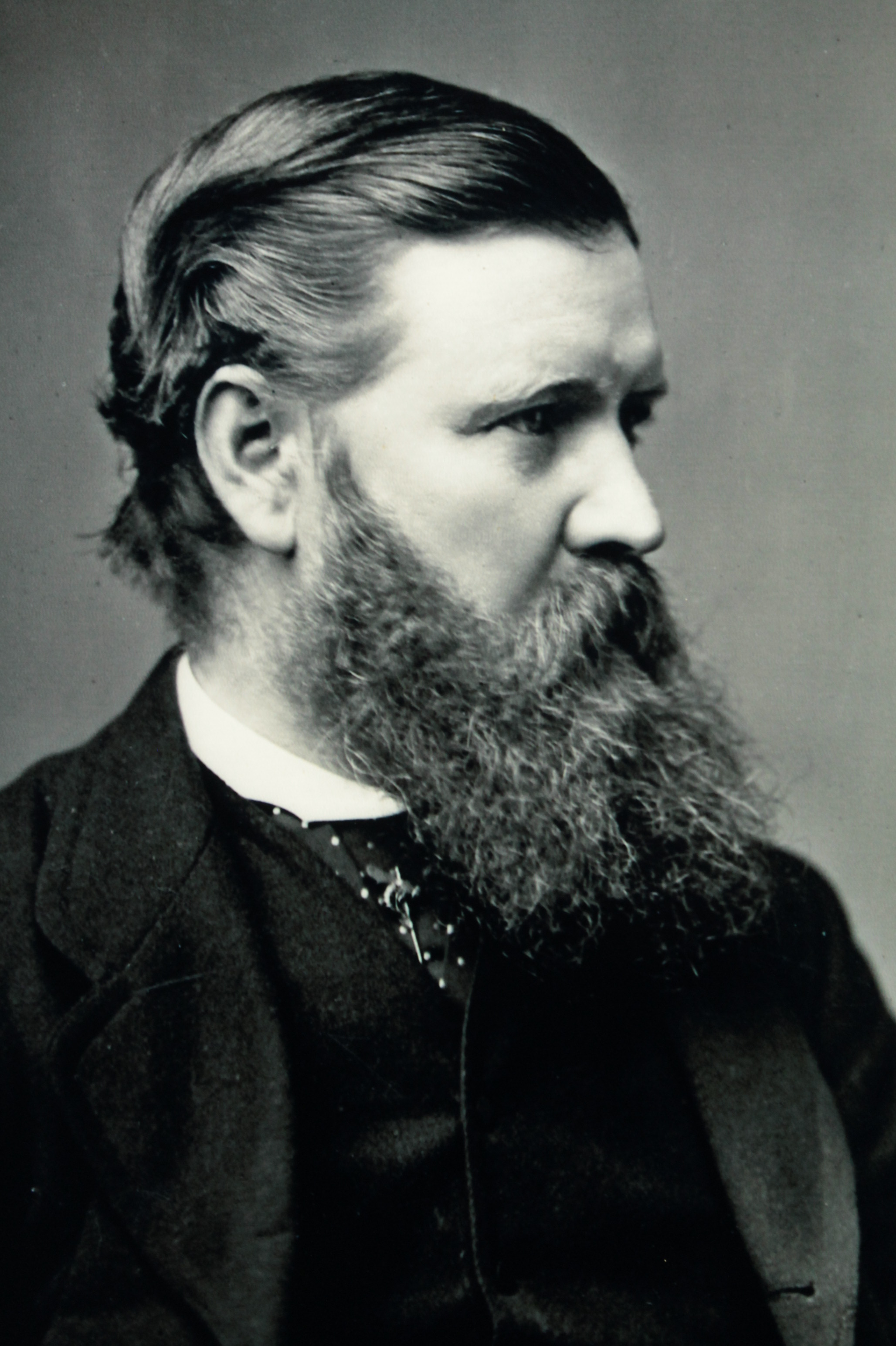
Wilson c.1865

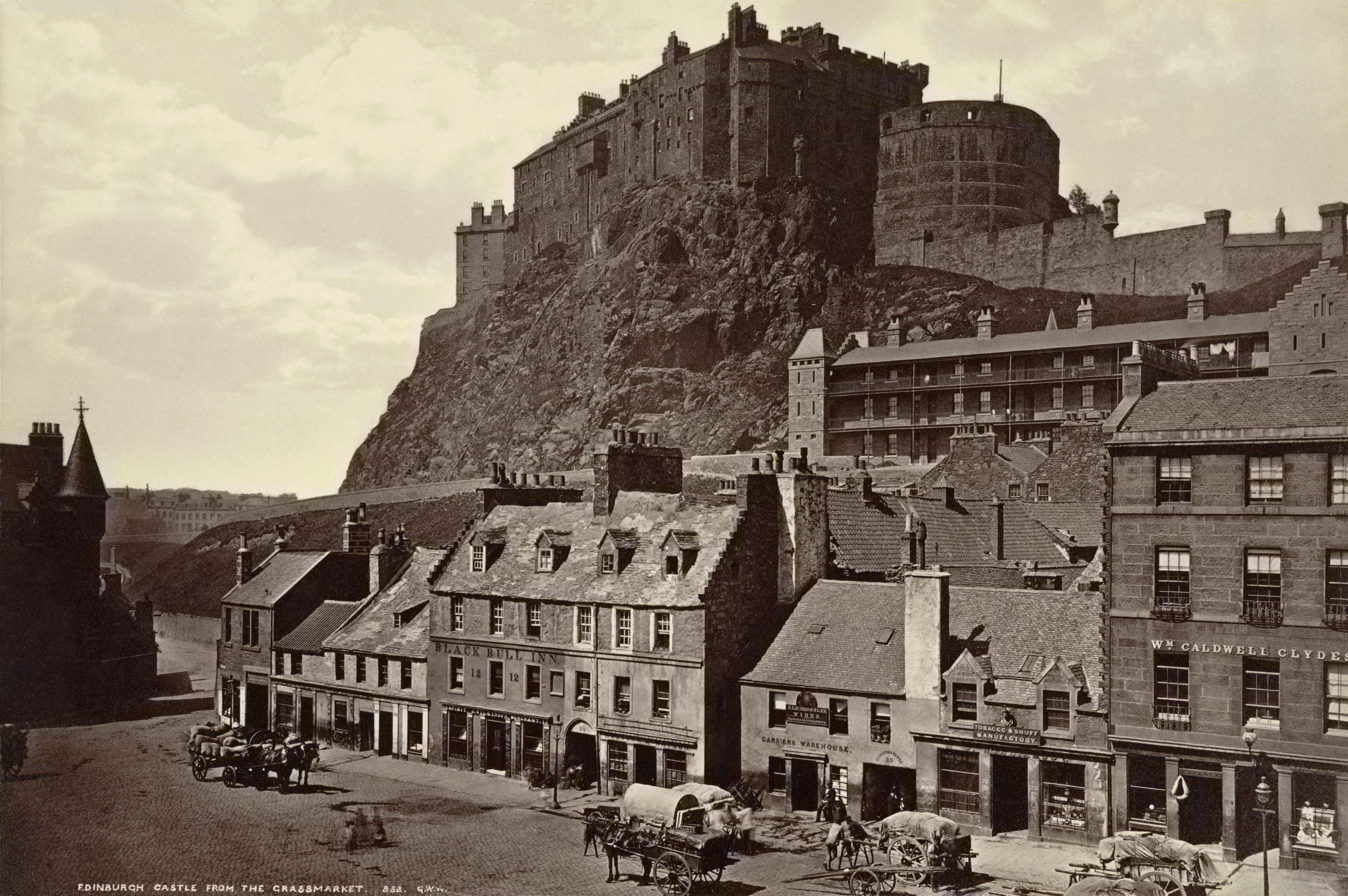
Edinburgh from the Grass Market

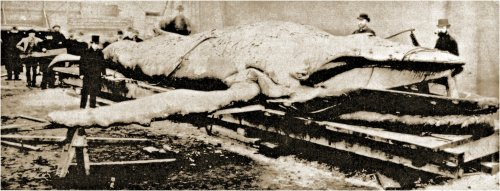
John Struthers (at left, in top hat) with the Tay Whale at John Woods' yard, Dundee, 1884, photographed by Wilson

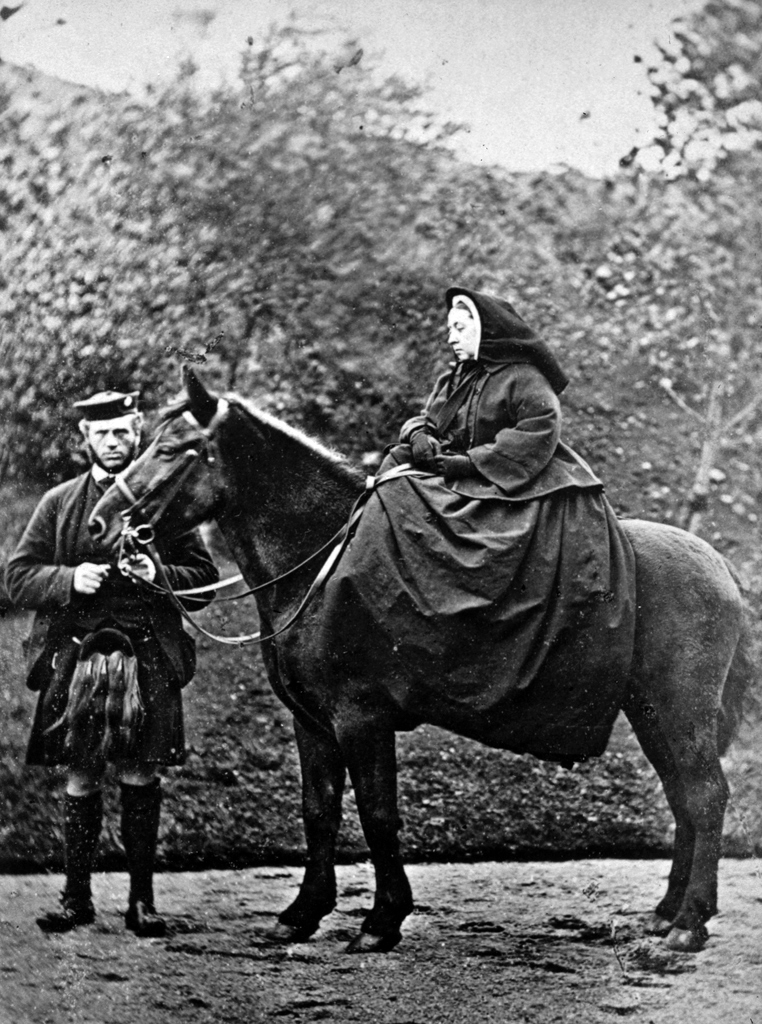
Queen Victoria on 'Fyvie' with John Brown at Balmoral, 1863, National Galleries of Scotland

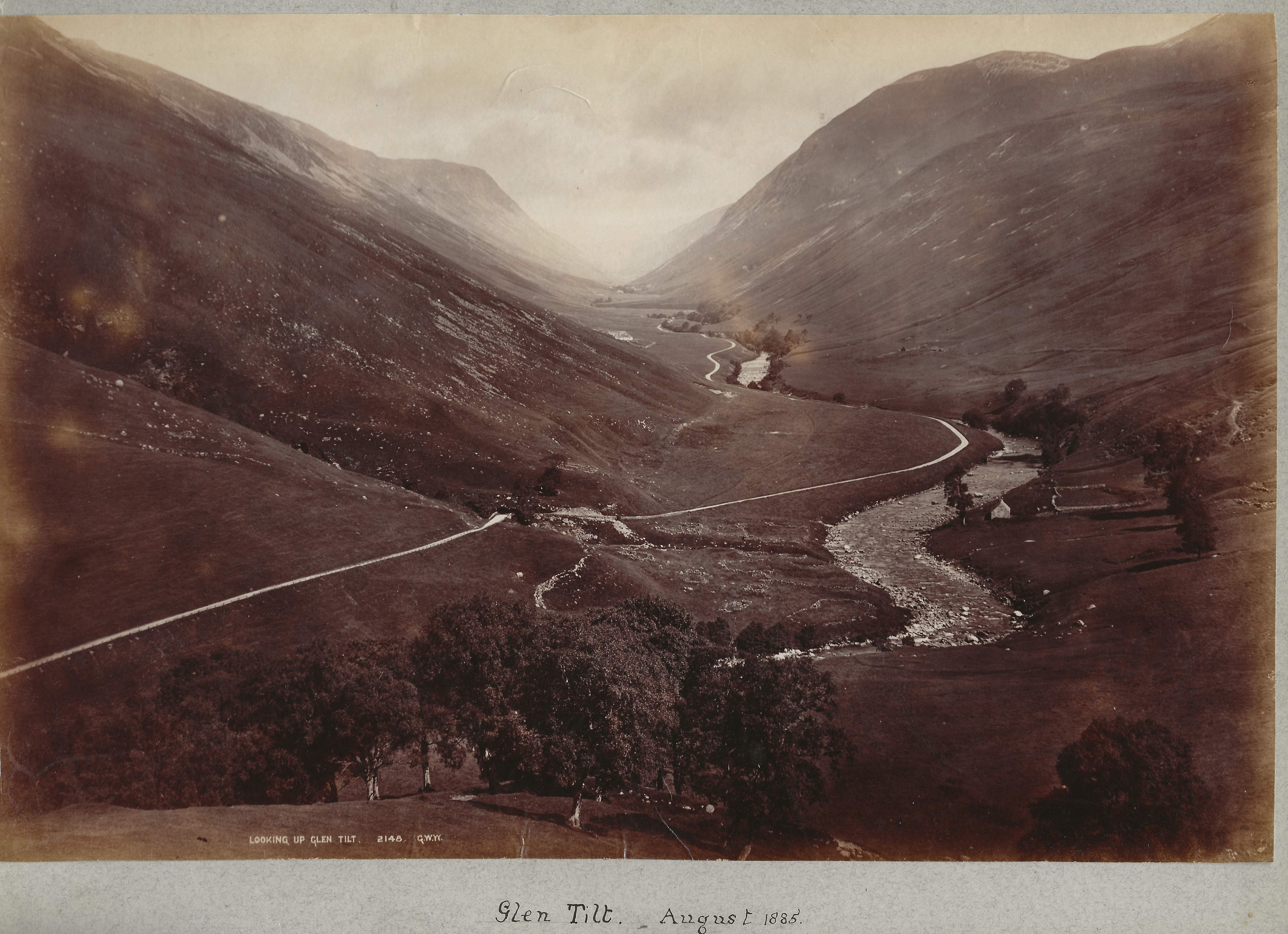
Wilson's August 1885 photograph of the Glen Tilt looking upstream toward Forest Lodge.

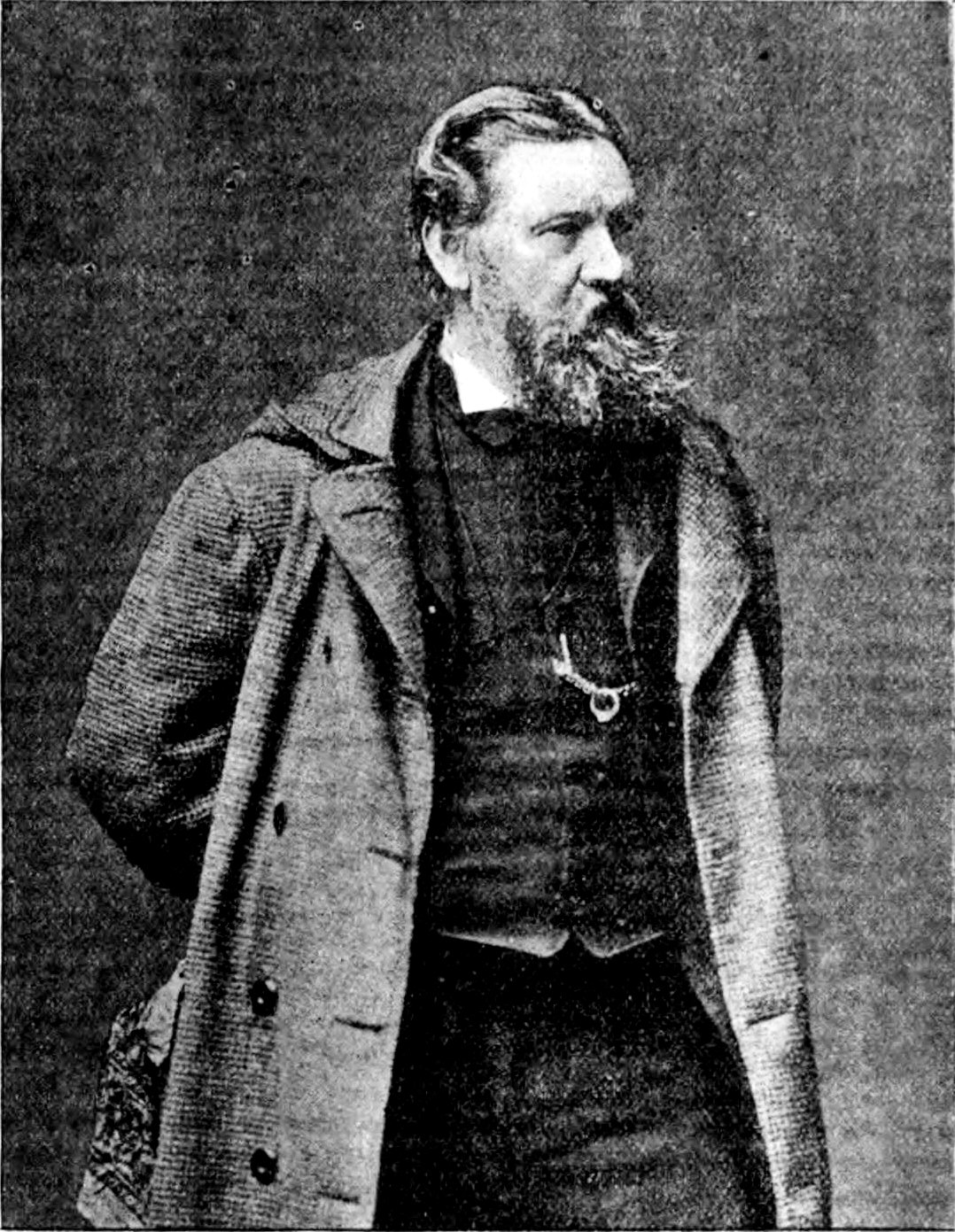
Engraving of George Washington Wilson

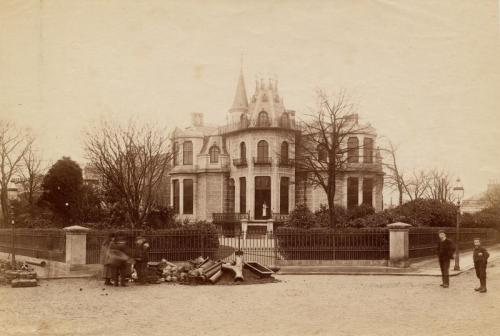
George Washington Wilson's House At Queen's Cross - artwork in Aberdeen Archives, Gallery and Museums Collection
