= Perry Green, Essex =

Hamlet in Essex, England

Coordinates: 51.868°N 0.625°E

Perry Green
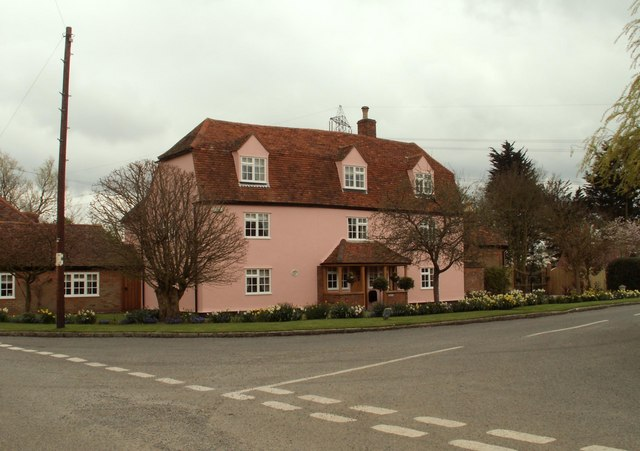
- Periwinkle Hall

- Location within Essex
- Civil parish: Bradwell
- District: Braintree
- Shire county: Essex
- Region: East
- Country: England
- Sovereign state: United Kingdom
- Police: Essex
- Fire: Essex
- Ambulance: East of England

Perry Green is a hamlet in the civil parish of Bradwell Juxta Coggeshall, in the Braintree district, in the county of Essex, England. For transport there is the A120 road nearby.
