= Pitcaple railway station =

Former railway station in Scotland

Pitcaple

General information
- Location: Pitcaple, Aberdeenshire; Scotland
- Coordinates: 57.3210°N 2.4612°W
- Platforms: 2

Other information
- Status: Disused

History
- Original company: Great North of Scotland Railway
- Pre-grouping: Great North of Scotland Railway

Key dates
- 20 September 1854: Opened
- 6 May 1968: Closed
Location

Pitcaple railway station is a former railway station in Aberdeenshire, Scotland. It opened on 20 September 1854, and closed down on 6 May 1968. It was part of the Great North of Scotland Railway.

== Location ==
Pitcaple railway station was in the hamlet of Pitcaple. It was between Inverurie railway station and Oyne railway station.

== Buildings ==
There were two rectangular buildings which made the railway station. The station was made of timber and clad and had two brick chimneys. The building only partially survived as of 14 November 2013.
