= Pickering Nook =

Village in County Durham, England

Coordinates: 54.896°N 1.733°W

- Location within County Durham
- OS grid reference: NZ171557
- Unitary authority: County Durham
- Ceremonial county: County Durham
- Region: North East
- Country: England
- Sovereign state: United Kingdom
- Post town: Newcastle upon Tyne
- Postcode district: NE16
- Police: Durham
- Fire: County Durham and Darlington
- Ambulance: North East

Pickering Nook is a village in County Durham, in England. It is situated a few miles north of Annfield Plain and Stanley, on the A692 between Consett and Gateshead.
