= Pitcaple =

Coordinates: 57°19′12″N 2°27′48″W

Pitcaple: Scottish Gaelic: Baile Chapaill
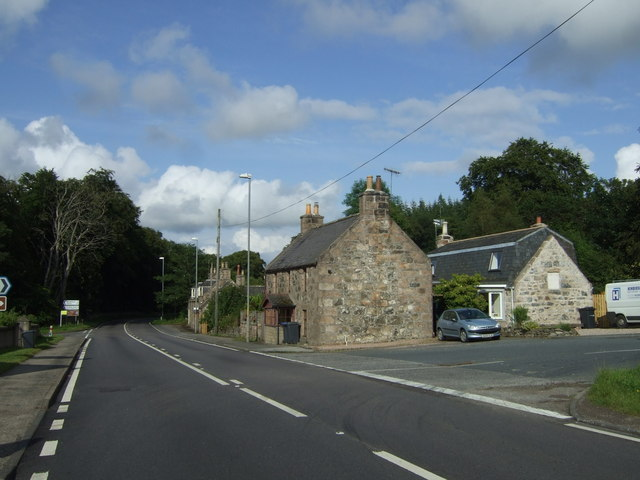
- Pitcaple

- Location within Aberdeenshire
- OS grid reference: NJ722251
- Council area: Aberdeenshire
- Lieutenancy area: Aberdeenshire
- Country: Scotland
- Sovereign state: United Kingdom
- Post town: INVERURIE
- Postcode district: AB51
- Police: Scotland
- Fire: Scottish
- Ambulance: Scottish
- UK Parliament: Gordon and Buchan
- Scottish Parliament: Aberdeenshire West

Pitcaple (Scottish Gaelic: Baile Chapaill) is a hamlet in Aberdeenshire, Scotland, on the banks of the River Urie, 4 miles (6.4 km) northwest of Inverurie.

Nearby Pitcaple Castle dates from around 1457 and was restored by William Burn in 1835.

There is a disused railway station.

== William Alexander ==
The journalist and author William Alexander (1826–1894) was brought up on Damhead Farm near Pitcaple.
