= Pipers Pool =

Hamlet in Cornwall, England

Coordinates: 50°37′52″N 4°27′36″W

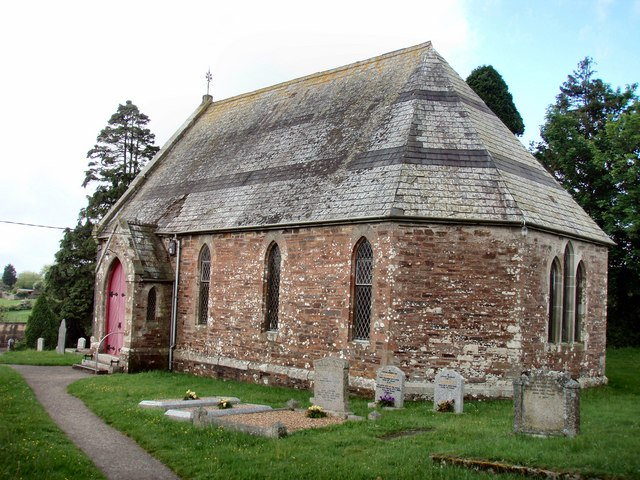
Pipers Pool Methodist Chapel

Pipers Pool (or Piper's Pool) is a hamlet in east Cornwall, England, UK. It is on the A395 road about 5½ miles west of Launceston.
