= Bradwell Juxta Coggeshall =

Village in Essex, England

Coordinates: 51.8784°N 0.6281°E

Bradwell
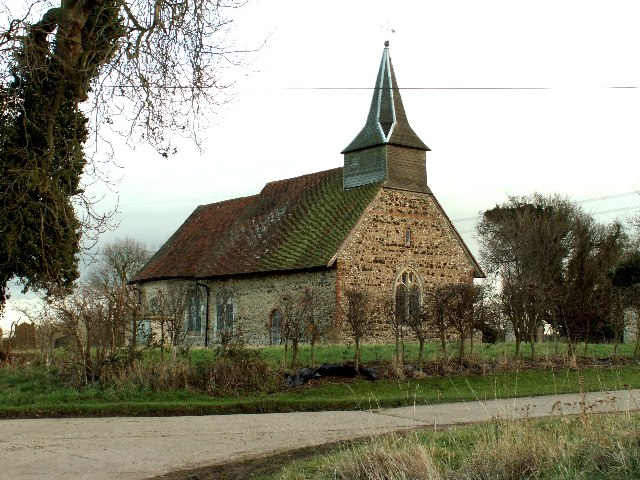
- Holy Trinity Church

- Location within Essex
- Population: 556 (Parish, 2021)
- OS grid reference: TL809232
- Civil parish: Bradwell
- District: Braintree
- Shire county: Essex
- Region: East
- Country: England
- Sovereign state: United Kingdom
- Post town: BRAINTREE
- Postcode district: CM77
- Dialling code: 01376
- Police: Essex
- Fire: Essex
- Ambulance: East of England
- UK Parliament: Braintree

Bradwell is a village and civil parish in Essex, England. The official name is just Bradwell, but it is sometimes called Bradwell juxta Coggeshall to distinguish it from other places called Bradwell. It is located on the River Blackwater, approximately 5 km (3.1 mi) east of Braintree and is 19 km (12 mi) north-northeast from the county town of Chelmsford. The village is in the district and parliamentary constituency of Braintree. At the 2021 census the parish had a population of 556.

== History ==
The name derives from Old English meaning broad well. To this day there is a spring a few metres north of the modern manor house of Bradwell Hall near to Holy Trinity Church. In the Middle Ages, this spring fed an overshot mill. Remains of the last mill on the site can still be seen in the overgrown surroundings of the millpool.

Bradwell is a dispersed village. There is no good evidence that the village was ever nucleated around the church. The modern village, on the A120 between Braintree and Coggeshall, is the former hamlet of Blackwater (also once known as Blackwater Green) by which name it was known into the twentieth century.

There is evidence for settlement in Bradwell as far back as the late Mesolithic period; some tools such as knapping stones and arrowheads have been uncovered. There are crop marks and some funerary remains attesting to Bronze Age settlers; excavations in the 1970s uncovered a large Iron Age ditch. One other probably Iron Age site remains unexcavated. Bradwell's prehistory is mostly unexplored.

Of Roman settlement there is scant evidence. Scattered building remains in one field to the east of the church suggest a farmstead, and Roman coins and pottery have occurred sporadically. The Romans did, however, build the road now known as the A120, running from Colchester to St Albans. In the 1850s the rebuilding of the bridge over the River Blackwater found Roman remains, including a horseshoe. The whereabouts of these remains is uncertain.

Before about 1140, the signs of Bradwell either in the historic or the archaeological record are small. There is one piece of evidence: a late Saxon document lists the estate of Glazenwood in Bradwell. The estate, perhaps little changed, remains. Bradwell, however, does not occur in the Domesday Book of 1086, although there is evidence to suggest that its entry is linked with that of nearby Kelvedon.
