= Perrywood =

Village in Kent, England

Coordinates: 51.2643°N 0.9227°E

Perrywood is a village and a wood near the village of Selling, in the Swale District, in the English county of Kent. It is south of the town of Faversham.
