= Pewit Island =

Island in Essex, England

Coordinates: 51.89241°N 1.23948°E

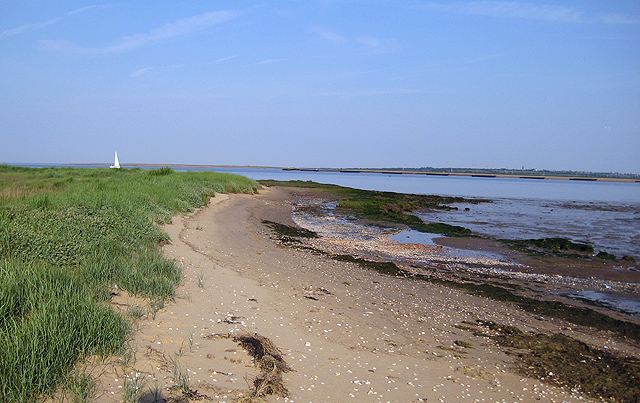
South shore of Pewit Island

Pewit Island is an uninhabited island at the north of Hamford Water off the coast of the English county of Essex. The nearest town is the port of Harwich along the coast to its north. Pewit Island is a Nature Reserve, owned and managed by the Little Oakley and District Wildfowlers Association, in conjunction with English Nature.
