= Pinewood, Hampshire =

Neighbourhood of Bordon, Hampshire, England

Coordinates: 51.1214°N 0.8640°W

Pinewood
- Location within Hampshire
- OS grid reference: SU796364
- Civil parish: Whitehill
- District: East Hampshire
- Shire county: Hampshire
- Region: South East
- Country: England
- Sovereign state: United Kingdom
- Post town: BORDON
- Postcode district: GU35
- Dialling code: 01420
- Police: Hampshire and Isle of Wight
- Fire: Hampshire and Isle of Wight
- Ambulance: South Central
- UK Parliament: East Hampshire

Pinewood or Pinewood Village is an area in Bordon, in the English county of Hampshire. Located in the north of the town, administratively it is in the parish of Whitehill, and the Whitehill Pinewood ward of East Hampshire district. Development of the area started in 1987 on the site of former married quarters at Bordon Camp that from 1970 had been leased for use as council housing and later purchased by the district council. The nearest railway station is Liphook, 4.4 miles (6.5 km) southeast of the village.
