= Percuil =

Coordinates: 50.168°N 4.998°W

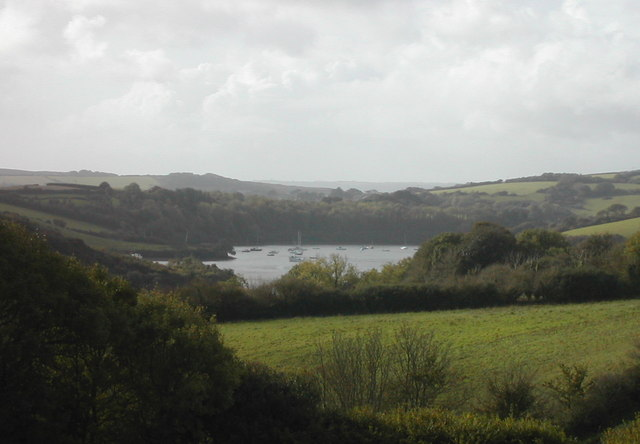
- The Percuil River from Lanhay

- Location within Cornwall
- OS grid reference: SW859341
- Unitary authority: Cornwall
- Ceremonial county: Cornwall
- Region: South West
- Country: England
- Sovereign state: United Kingdom

Percuil is a hamlet in Roseland, Cornwall, England. Percuil (or Porthcuel) is on the east bank of the Percuil River and south-west of Gerrans.
