= Perton, Herefordshire =

Hamlet in Herefordshire, England

Coordinates: 52.06140°N 2.58923°W

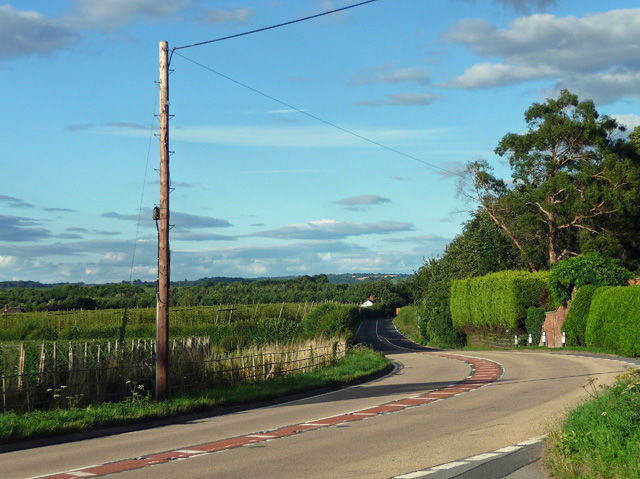
Main Road, Perton

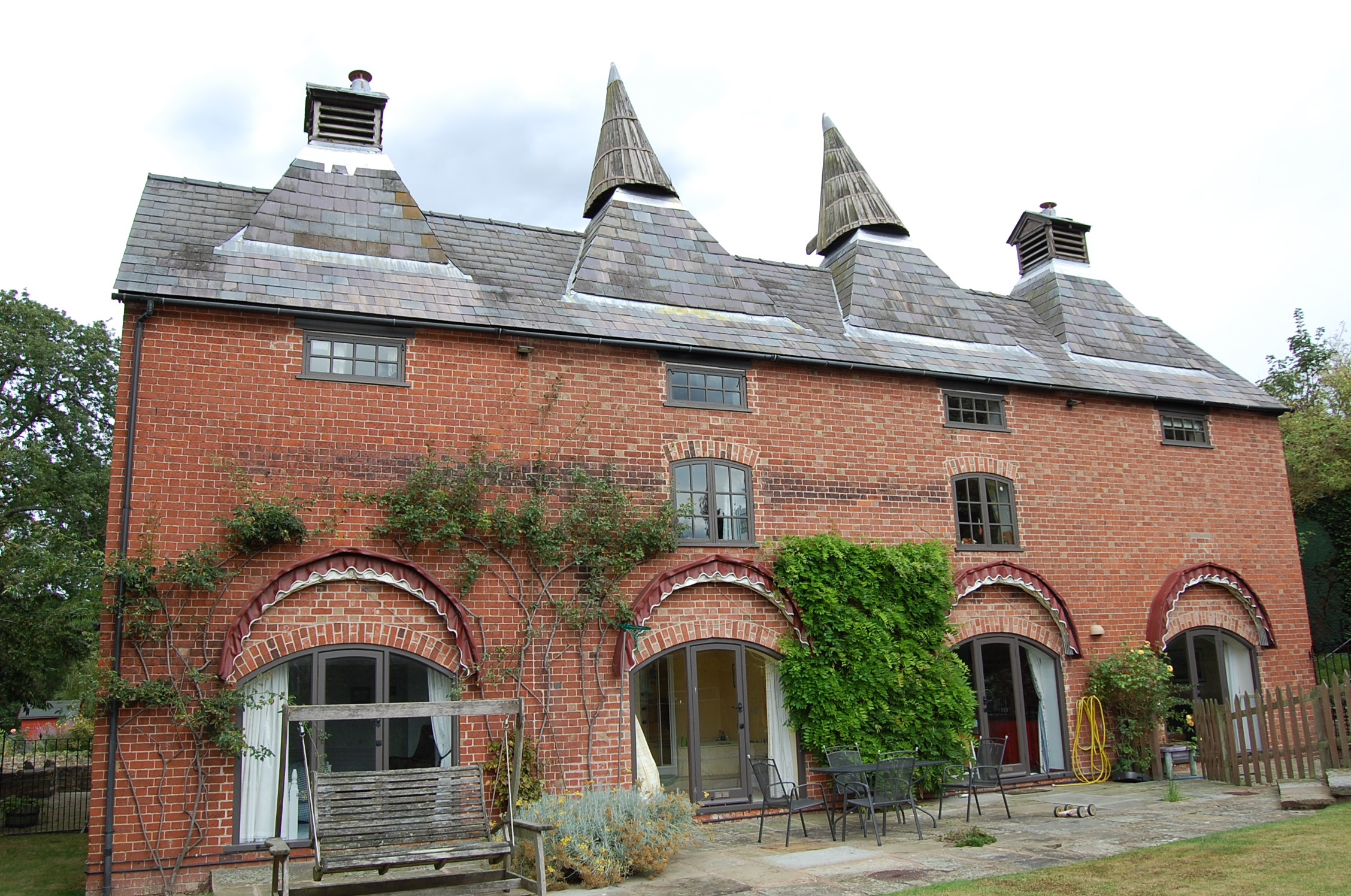
Converted oast house, Perton Farm

Perton is a hamlet in the English county of Herefordshire.

It is in the civil parish of Stoke Edith being west of the village of that name.
