= Picket Piece =

Village in Hampshire, England

Coordinates: 51.217960°N 1.44117°W

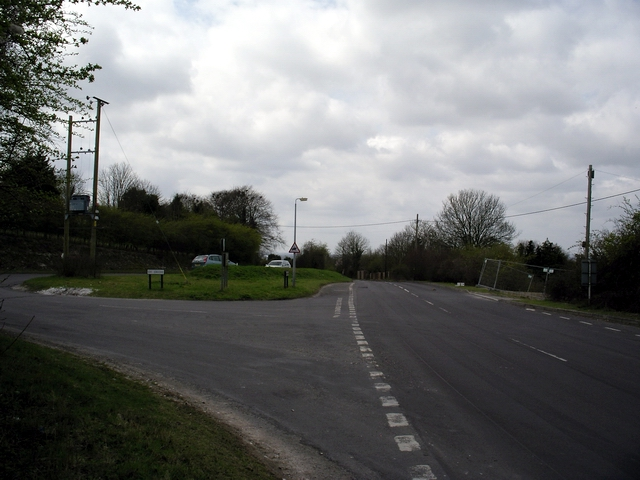

- Location within Hampshire
- OS grid reference: SU3912646677
- Civil parish: Andover
- District: Test Valley
- Shire county: Hampshire
- Region: South East
- Country: England
- Sovereign state: United Kingdom
- Post town: ANDOVER
- Postcode district: SP11 6
- Dialling code: 01264
- Police: Hampshire and Isle of Wight
- Fire: Hampshire and Isle of Wight
- Ambulance: South Central
- UK Parliament: North West Hampshire

Picket Piece is a small village in the Test Valley district of Hampshire, England. Andover lies approximately 2 miles (3.2 km) south-west from the village.

The village has expanded rapidly since 2015 with several new roads and house building. In October 2017 Test Valley Council approved another 520 homes to be built in the village.

There is one church in the village. It started as the Harroway Mission. It is named after the Whitchurch to Andover road (part of the Harrow Way) that ran through Picket Piece to Andover. When the Walworth Industrial Estate was built in the 1960s, that stretch of the road was renamed Walworth Road.

The Mission was built by the Congregational (now the United Reformed Church) in Andover. It last appeared in the United Reformed Church yearbook in 2001.
