= Platt's Heath =

Village in Kent, England

Coordinates: 51°13′25″N 0°41′15″E

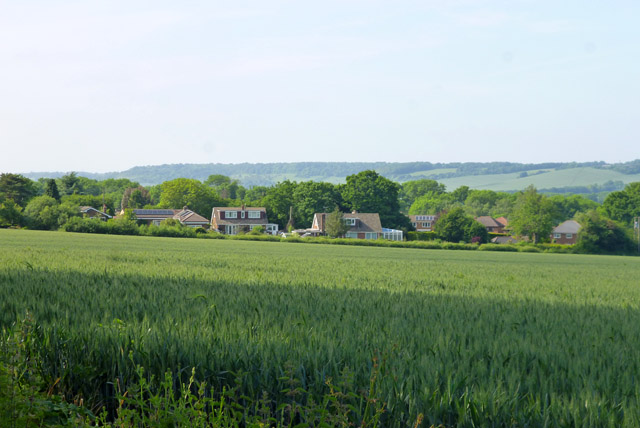
Platt's Heath

Platts Heath is a hamlet in the civil parish of Lenham, Kent, England.

It is also the source of the River Len, which flows in a westerly direction to join the River Medway at Maidstone.
