= Petherwin Gate =

Coordinates: 50.6772°N 4.4333°W

- Location within Cornwall
- OS grid reference: SX2889
- Unitary authority: Cornwall
- Ceremonial county: Cornwall
- Region: South West
- Country: England
- Sovereign state: United Kingdom
- Police: Devon and Cornwall
- Fire: Cornwall
- Ambulance: South Western

Petherwin Gate is a hamlet in Cornwall, England. It is about half a mile south of North Petherwin.
