= Picket Hill =

Hamlet in Hampshire, England

Coordinates: 50.850009°N 1.743766°W

- Location within Hampshire
- OS grid reference: SU1813505641
- District: New Forest
- Shire county: Hampshire
- Region: South East
- Country: England
- Sovereign state: United Kingdom
- Post town: RINGWOOD
- Postcode district: BH24 3
- Dialling code: 01590
- Police: Hampshire and Isle of Wight
- Fire: Hampshire and Isle of Wight
- Ambulance: South Central
- UK Parliament: New Forest West

Picket Hill is a hamlet next to Picket Post in the New Forest National Park of Hampshire, England. It lies on the outskirts of Ringwood.
