= Plain Street =

Road junction in Cornwall, England, UK

Coordinates: 50.572°N 4.861°W

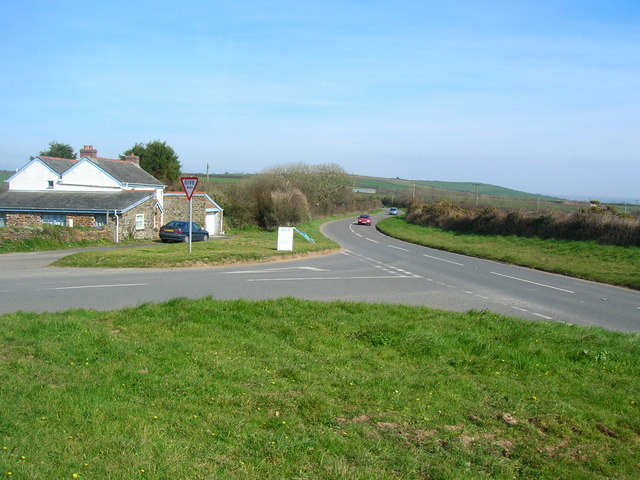
Plain Street

Plain Street is a hamlet with a road junction near Trelights in Cornwall, England.
