= Pityme =

Village in north Cornwall, England

Coordinates: 50°33′15″N 4°53′30″W

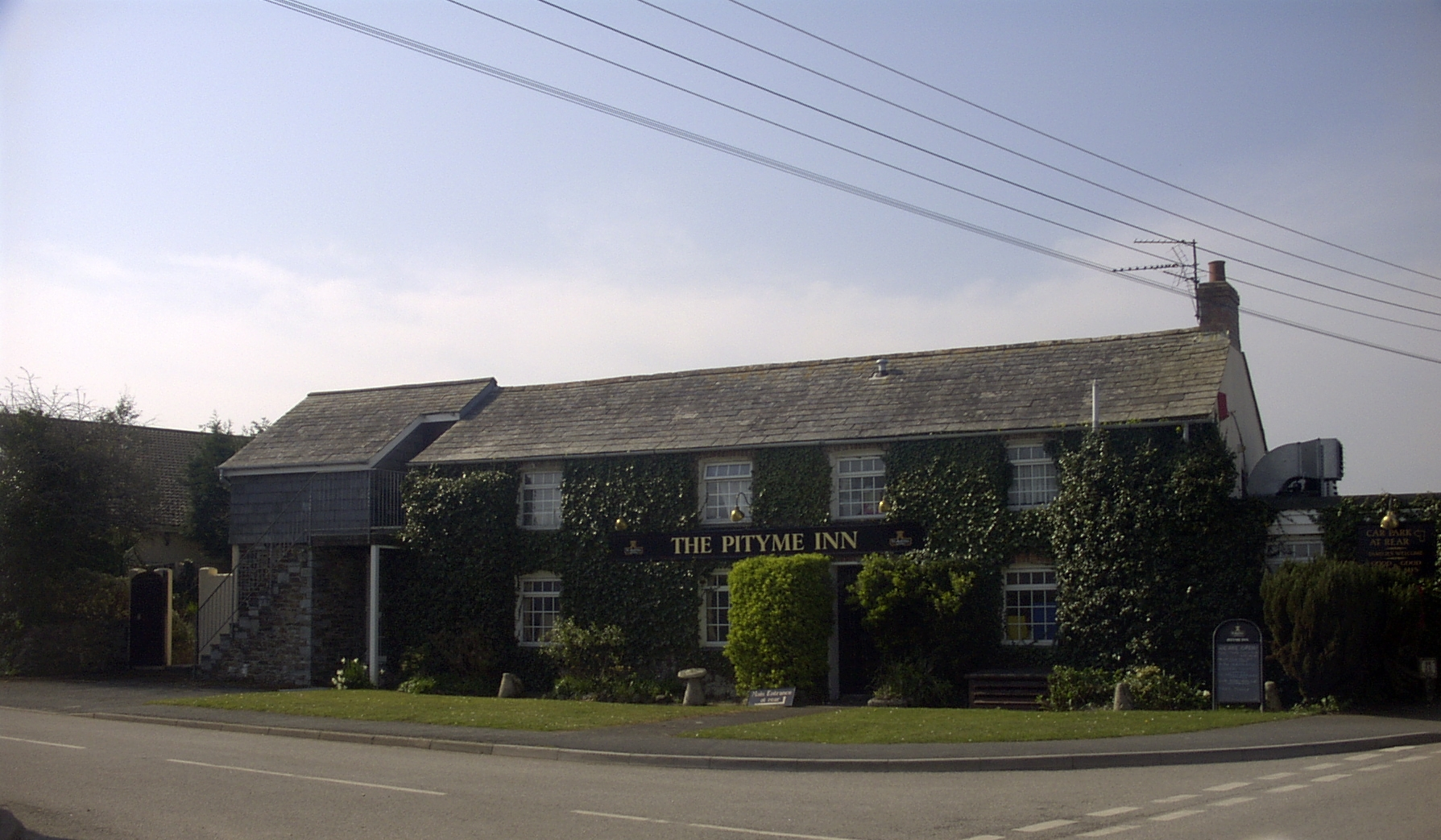
The village pub in Pityme

Pityme (/ˈpɪtiˌmiː/) is a small village at grid reference SW 952 767 in north Cornwall, England, United Kingdom.

Pityme is at the junction of the road from Wadebridge to Polzeath and the road from St Minver to Rock. It straddles the boundary between the civil parishes of St Minver Highlands and St Minver Lowlands. It is situated between Tredrizzick and Splatt although the villages form one contiguous settlement. The public house is the Pityme Inn and there is a small trading estate south of the village. The name of the village has its origins in a tragic tale of loss at sea. The skipper of a fishing vessel set to sea despite the deteriorating weather. All hands were lost. The women of the village went, as a group, to the widow of the captain to berate her for her husband's culpability in their widowhood. She explained: "I have lost my husband too, so you should also pity me" - hence Pityme Inn. Another story refers to the sea having been closer to the village and is a corruption of the French expression petite mer (small sea). Similar tales are told of Pity Me in County Durham.
