= Pleck, Marnhull, Dorset =

Hamlet in Dorset, England

Coordinates: 50.9589°N 2.3251°W

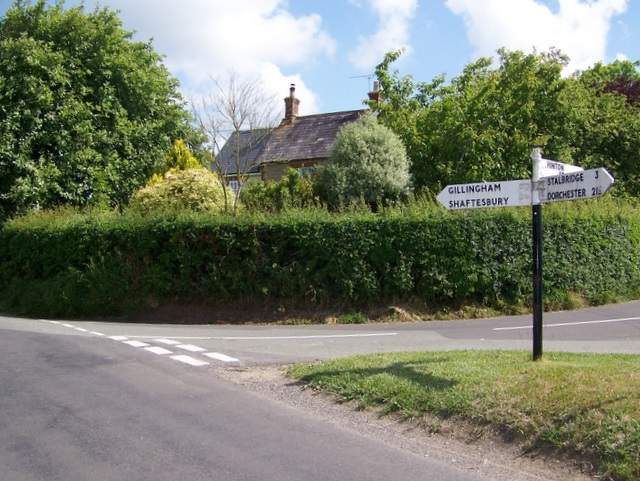
The road junction at Pleck

Pleck is a small hamlet to the south of Marnhull, one of the largest villages in England. It lies close to the River Stour in Dorset. It consists of nine houses. The name ‘Pleck’ is thought to stem from the Saxon word meaning an ‘exposed place’, which is fitting for the hamlet that sits on a hill overlooking the Vale of the Three Dairies. Pleck is a fairly common name in this part of Dorset, one at DT9 and this one.
