= La Motte-Picquet =

La Motte-Picquet, LaMotte-Picquet, laMotte-Picquet, la Motte-Picquet, Lamotte-Picquet, or variation, may refer to:

- Toussaint-Guillaume Picquet de la Motte (1720-1791, aka la Motte-Piquet), 18th-century admiral
- French ship La Motte-Picquet, a list of ships of the French Navy named after the admiral
  - French frigate La Motte-Picquet (D 645), a French Navy F70 type anti-submarine frigate
  - French cruiser La Motte-Picquet, a French Navy Duguay-Trouin-class light cruiser launched in 1924
  - La Motte-Picquet-class cruiser, a cancelled pre-WW1 French Navy cruiser class
- La Motte-Picquet–Grenelle station, a Paris Metro station
  - Avenue de la Motte-Picquet, the street that said Paris Metro station is named after

== See also ==
- Picquet (disambiguation)
- Lamotte (disambiguation)
- Motte (disambiguation)
- Piquette (disambiguation)
- Piquet (disambiguation)
- Picket (disambiguation)
- Pickett (disambiguation)
