= Pique =

Pique or piqué may refer to:

== Arts and entertainment ==
- Piqué (ballet), a dance movement
- Pique (play), an 1875 play produced by Augustin Daly
- "Pique", an episode of Law & Order: Special Victims Unit (season 2)

== Ships ==
- HMS Pique, seven ships of the Royal Navy
- USS PC-1249, a US Navy submarine chaser sold to France as Pique (W13)

== People ==
- Piqué (surname)

== Other uses ==
- Pique sauce
- Piqué (weaving), a weaving style
- Pique (river), Haute-Garonne, southern France
- Tungiasis, a skin parasite known as "pique" in much of South America
- Pique Newsmagazine, a Canadian magazine
- Pique, the 1986 FIFA World Cup mascot
- Piqué, a type of shot in artistic billiards
- Pique (abstract algebra), a quasigroup with an idempotent element

== See also ==
- Piqué work, a type of jewelry made from tortoiseshell inlaid with gold or silver
- Piquet (disambiguation)
- Piquer (surname)
