= Georges-Picot =

Georges-Picot is a surname. Notable people with the surname include:

- François Georges-Picot (1870–1951), French diplomat and lawyer
- Olga Georges-Picot (1940–1997), French actress
