= Pigot (surname) =

Pigot is an English surname.

The Pigot Baronetcy is a title in the Baronetage of Great Britain.

== Derivation and variants ==
The name Pigot is derived from Picot. The latter is recorded as a given name in the Domesday Book, but its origin is not clear. William Camden suggested a derivation from Old French picote meaning pock-marked, freckled.

Pigott, Piggott and Pickett are variant forms.

== People with the surname Pigot ==
- Mary Pigot (daughter of Gervase Pigot), former wife of Sir Robert Burdett, 3rd Baronet (1640–1716)
- George Pigot, 1st Baron Pigot (1719–1777), governor of Madras
- General Sir Henry Pigot, British army officer, in Malta in 1800 for the French surrender
- John Edward Pigot (1822–1871), Irish music collector
- Edward Pigot (1858–1929), Irish/Australian Jesuit priest, seismologist and astronomer
- Robert Pigot (disambiguation), various people
- Hugh Pigot (disambiguation), various people
- Neil Pigot (born 1961), Australian actor
- Spencer Pigot (born 1993), American racing driver

Fictional characters

- Serafine Pigot, a character in the 1997 An American Werewolf in Paris motion picture

== See also ==
- Pigot (disambiguation): other meanings
- Pigott (surname)
