= Pickett =

Pickett is an English surname. It is a variant form of Pigott. Notable people with the surname include:

- Adarius Pickett (born 1996), American football player
- Albert J. Pickett (1810–1858), American historian
- Allison Deforest Pickett (1900–1991), Canadian entomologist
- Allistair Pickett (born 1973), Australian rules footballer
- Ava Pickett (born 1993 or 1994) British screenwriter and playwright
- Bill Pickett (1870–1932), American cowboy and rodeo performer
- Bob Pickett (American football) (1932–2010), American football player
- Bobby Pickett (1938–2007), American singer
- Brad Pickett (born 1978), British mixed martial arts fighter
- Byron Pickett (born 1977), Australian rules footballer
- Carroll Pickett (1933–2022), American Presbyterian minister
- Carson Pickett (born 1993), American women's soccer player
- Charles E. Pickett (1866–1930), American politician from Iowa
- Cindy Pickett (born 1947), American actress
- Cody Pickett (born 1980), Canadian football player
- Cornelius A. Pickett (1902–1990), American politician and Mayor of Houston, Texas (1941–43)
- Dan Pickett, (born 1968), American technology entrepreneur, private equity investor and philanthropist
- Dan Pickett (musician) (1907–1967), American Piedmont blues and country blues singer, guitarist and songwriter
- DJ Pickett, American football player
- George Pickett (1825–1875), United States Army officer and Confederate general
- Harry Pickett (1862–1907), English cricketer
- Hugh Pickett (1913–2006), Canadian impresario
- Jalen Pickett (born 1999), American basketball player
- Janet Taylor Pickett (born 1948), American artist
- Jay Pickett (1961–2021), American actor
- Joe Pickett (politician) (born 1956), American politician from Texas
- John Pickett (disambiguation), several people
- Joseph Pickett (painter) (1848–1918), American painter
- Justin Pickett, British actor
- Kenny Pickett (born 1998), American football player
- Keri Pickett (born 1959), American photographer and filmmaker
- Lucy Weston Pickett (1904–1997), American chemist and zoologist
- Owen B. Pickett (1930–2010), American former politician from Virginia
- Michael Pickett (musician), (born 1950), Canadian blues singer
- Phil Pickett (born 1948), English composer, musician and record producer
- Philip Pickett (born 1950), English musician
- Reg Pickett (1927–2012), English former professional footballer
- Rex Pickett (born 1958), American writer
- Ricky Pickett (born 1970), American baseball player
- Ritchie Pickett (1955–2011), New Zealand singer/songwriter
- Ryan Pickett (born 1979), American football player
- Ryan Pickett (filmmaker), American filmmaker
- Shane Pickett (1957–2010), Australian artist
- Ted Pickett (1909–2009), Australian sportsman
- Tim Pickett (born 1981), American basketball player
- Tina Pickett (born 1943), American politician from Pennsylvania
- Tom Pickett (outlaw) (1858–1934), American cowboy and professional gambler
- Tom Pickett (1906–1980), American politician from Texas
- Tony Pickett (born 1953), former Australian rules footballer
- Vernon W. Pickett (1912–1944), United States Army officer
- Victoria Pickett (born 1996), Canadian soccer player
- William Pickett (cricketer) (1805–1849), English cricketer
- William Pickett (alderman) (died 1796), English goldsmith and local politician, Lord Mayor of London in 1789
- William B. Pickett (born 1940), American historian
- Wilson Pickett (1941–2006), American rock and roll singer-songwriter

== See also ==
- Pickett (disambiguation)
- Picket (disambiguation)
