= Picot (surname) =

Picot is a surname. Notable people with the name include:

- Auguste Marie Henri Picot de Dampierre (1756–1793), a general of the French Revolution
- Georges Picot (1838–1909), French historian and lawyer
- François Georges-Picot (1870–1951), son of Georges, French diplomat, co-author of the Sykes-Picot Agreement
- Olga Georges-Picot (1940–1977), granddaughter of François, French actress
- François-Édouard Picot (1786–1868), French painter
- Hajnalka Kiraly Picot (born 1971), French fencer
