= Kickett =

Kickett is a surname. Notable people with the surname include:

- Professor Cheryl Kickett-Tucker (born c. 1968), research fellow at Curtin University, Western Australia involved with Aboriginal community development programs
- Dale Kickett (born 1968), Australian rules footballer
- Derek Kickett (born 1962), Australian rules footballer
- Leon Kickett (born 2006), Australian rules footballer

== See also ==
- Kickert
- Pickett
