= Pigott (surname) =

Pigott and Piggott are English surnames.

The Pigott Baronetcy is a title in the Baronetage of Great Britain.

== Derivation and variants ==
The name Pigott / Piggott is derived from Picot. The latter is recorded as a given name in the Domesday Book, but its origin is unclear. It may stem from the Germanic or Old English pic, a sharply pointed hill, being applied to residents living near such a feature, or could have been used for a tall, thin person as pic could mean a sharp or pointed tool. William Camden suggested a derivation from Old French picote meaning pock-marked, freckled.

Pigot and Pickett are variant forms.

== People with the surname Pigott ==
- Donald Pigott (1928–2022), British botanist
- Edward Pigott (1753–1825), English astronomer, son of Nathaniel, also an astronomer
- Eugene F. Pigott Jr. (born 1946), American jurist
- Florence Pigott (1878–1899), English operatic singer and ballet dancer
- Francis Pigott (1665–1704), English composer
- Francis Pigott Stainsby Conant (1810–1863), British politician
- Fred Pigott (1895–1979), British mountaineer
- Gwyn Hanssen Pigott (1935–2013), Australian potter
- Jean Pigott (1924–2012), Canadian politician
- Jean Sophia Pigott (1845–1882), Irish poet
- Joe Pigott (born 1993), English footballer
- John Pigott (c. 1550 – by 1627), English politician
- Marjorie Pigott (1904–1990), Canadian artist
- Mark Pigott (born 1954), American businessman
- Mostyn Pigott (1865–1927), English humorist, writer and barrister
- Nathaniel Pigott (1725–1804), English astronomer
- Nick Pigott (born 1951), British editor of The Railway Magazine
- Richard Pigott (1835–1889), Irish journalist and forger
- Stuart Pigott (born 1960), British wine critic
- Tim Pigott-Smith (1946–2017), British actor
- Tony Pigott (1958–2026), English cricketer
- William Pigott (1839–1909), English-born Zimbabwean politician
- William Trigg Pigott (1860–1944), Justice of the Montana Supreme Court

== People with the surname Piggott ==
- Audrey Piggott (1906-2001), British cellist, composer and writer
- Derek Piggott (1922–2019), British glider pilot
- Emeline Piggott (1836–1919), Confederate States of America spy
- Francis Taylor Piggott (1852–1925), British jurist and scholar of Japan
- Jim Piggott, Canadian ice hockey player, after whom the Jim Piggott Memorial Trophy is named
- Joan R. Piggott (born 1947), American historian
- Lester Piggott (1935–2022), British jockey
- Marcus Piggott (born 1971), Welsh fashion photographer
- Pércival Piggott (born 1966), Panamanian footballer
- Patrick Piggott (1915–1990), English composer, pianist and musicologist
- Rosslynd Piggott (born 1958), Australian installation artist and painter
- Stuart Piggott (1910–1996), British archaeologist
- Tracy Piggott (born 1966), British jockey and broadcaster working in Ireland, daughter of Lester Piggott
- Victor Herrera Piggott (born 1980), Panamanian footballer
- William Roy Piggott (1914–2008), British scientist

=== Fictional characters ===
- Owd Grandad Piggott, character on BBC Radio Stoke
- William Piggott, minor character in Quality Street, 1964

== See also ==
- Pigot (surname)
- Pigot (disambiguation); other meanings of Pigot, Pigott, Piggott, Pigotts and Piggotts
