= Picquet =

Picquet may refer to:

== An alternative spelling for Picket ==
- Picquet (military), a small temporary military post closer to the enemy than the main formation; or a group of soldiers detailed for a specific duty (e.g., fire picquet)
- Picquet (punishment), a form of military punishment in vogue in the 16th and 17th centuries in Europe

== People ==
- François Picquet (1708–1781), Sulpician priest who came to Montreal from France in 1734
- Count Toussaint-Guillaume Picquet de la Motte (1720–1791), French admiral
- Aimé Picquet du Boisguy (1776–1839), French chouan general during the French Revolution
- Louisa Picquet (c. 1828,–1896), American whose life became the subject of a biography Louisa Picquet, the Octoroon, or, Inside Views of Southern Domestic Life
- Christian Picquet, pseudonym of Christian Lamothe (born 1952), French activist and politician

== See also ==
- La Motte-Picquet (disambiguation)
- Picket (disambiguation)
- Pickett (disambiguation)
- Piquet (disambiguation), another alternative spelling for picket
- Piquette (disambiguation)
