= Pigot =

Pigot, Pigott, Piggott, Pigotts or Piggotts may refer to:

== People ==
- Pigot (surname), including a list of people with this name
- Pigott (surname), including a list of people with the surname Pigott or Piggott

== Places ==
- Piggott, Arkansas, United States, a city
- Piggott Peninsula, Antarctica
- Pigott Street, London
- Piggotts, a small township in Antigua
- 10220 Pigott, an asteroid

== Other uses ==
- HM galley Pigot, two Royal Navy vessels
- Pigot (East Indiaman), two British East India Company vessels
- Pigot baronets, a title in the Baronetage of Great Britain
- Pigott baronets, a title in the Baronetage of the United Kingdom
- Pigott's Building, a heritage-listed department store in Toowoomba, Queensland
- Pigot's Directory, a British directory first published in 1814
- Pigot Diamond, a famous diamond
- The Piggott School, a Church of England academy secondary school in Twyford, Berkshire, England
- Piggott High School, Pigott, Arkansas

== See also ==
- Abington Pigotts, a village in Cambridgeshire, England
- Acton Pigott, Shropshire
- Aston Pigott, a hamlet in Shropshire, England
