= 1952 Republican National Convention =

Political convention

- 1952 presidential election
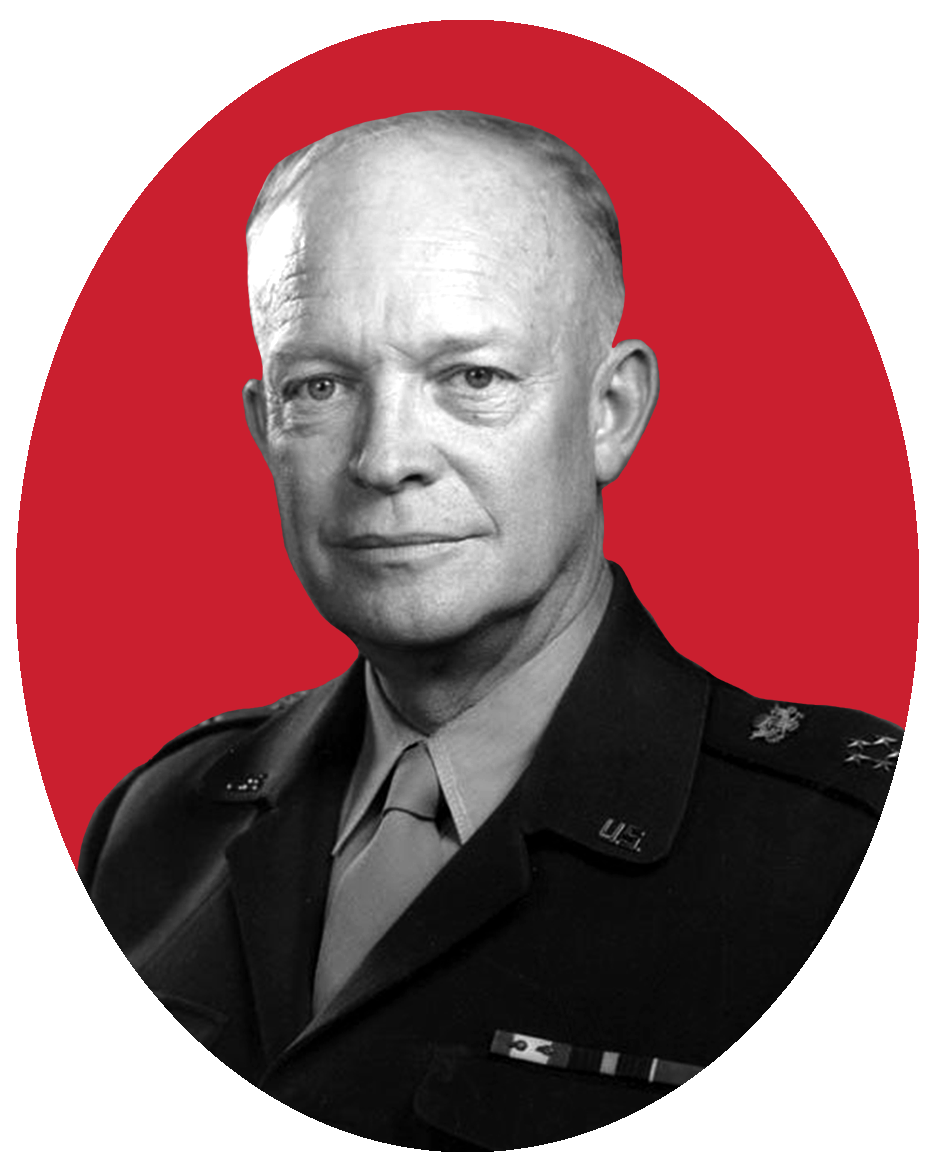
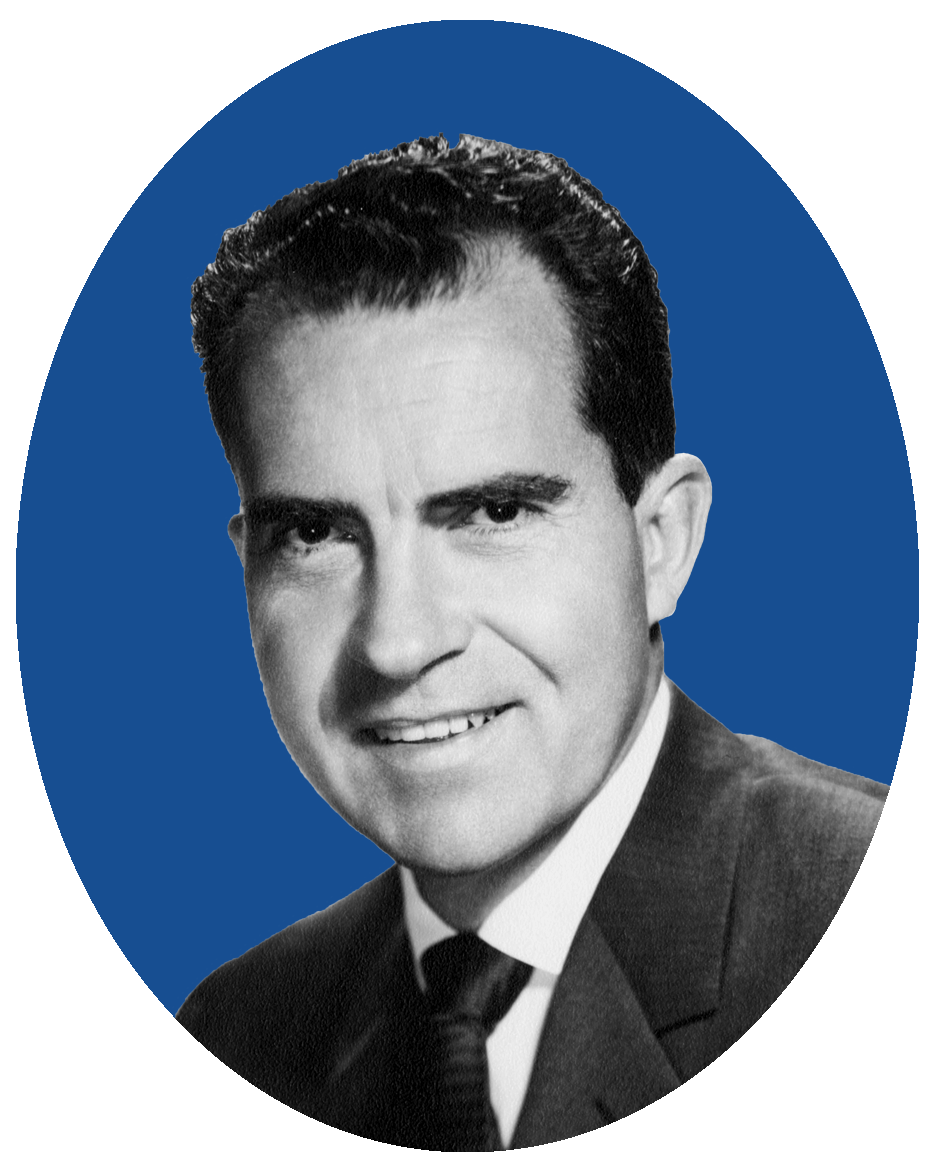
- Nominees; Eisenhower and Nixon

Convention
- Dates: July 7–11, 1952
- City: Chicago, Illinois
- Venue: International Amphitheatre
- Chair: Joseph D. Rose
- Keynote speaker: Douglas MacArthur

Candidates
- Presidential nominee: Dwight D. Eisenhower of New York
- Vice-presidential nominee: Richard M. Nixon of California

The 1952 Republican National Convention was held at the International Amphitheatre in Chicago, Illinois from July 7 to 11, 1952, and nominated Dwight D. Eisenhower of New York, nicknamed "Ike", for president and then Richard M. Nixon of California for vice president.

The Republican platform pledged to end the unpopular war in Korea, supported the development of nuclear weapons as a deterrence strategy, to fire all "the loafers, incompetents and unnecessary employees" at the State Department, condemned the Roosevelt and Truman administrations' economic policies, supported retention of the Taft–Hartley Act, opposed "discrimination against race, religion or national origin", supported "Federal action toward the elimination of lynching", and pledged to bring an end to communist subversion in the United States.

== Logistics ==
=== Convention officers ===
- Permanent chairman: Joseph W. Martin Jr. of Massachusetts
- Temporary chairman: Walter S. Hallanan of West Virginia

=== Television coverage ===
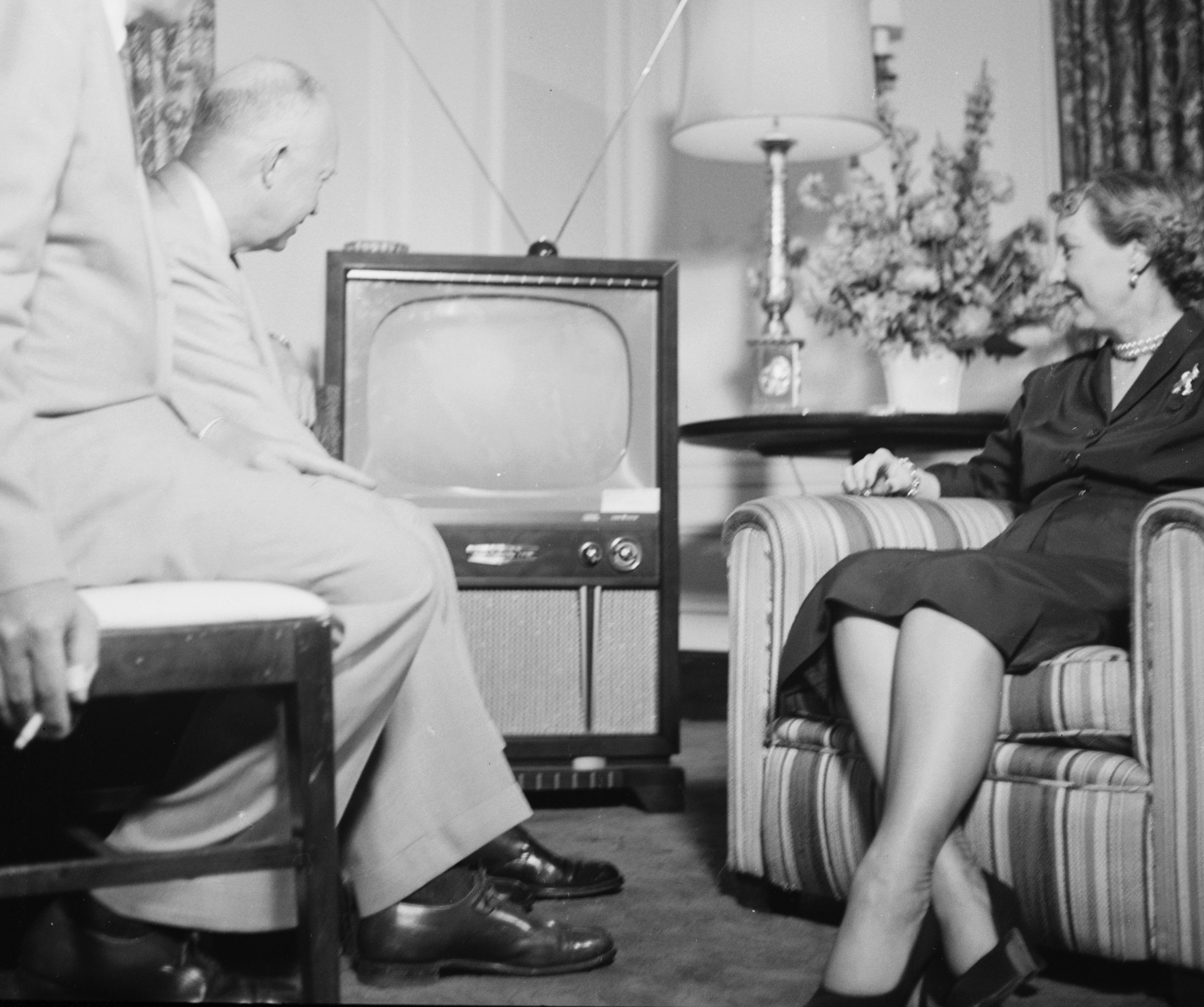
Dwight and Mamie Eisenhower watching a television during the convention

The 1952 Republican convention was the first political convention to be televised live, coast-to-coast. Experiments in regionally broadcasting conventions took place during the Republican and Democratic conventions in 1948; however, 1952 was the first year in which networks carried nationwide coverage of political conventions. Fixed cameras were placed at the back and the sides of the International Amphitheatre for the press to use collectively. None of these offered a straight shot of the podium on stage, so many networks supplemented their coverage with shots from their own portable cameras.

== Keynote speech ==
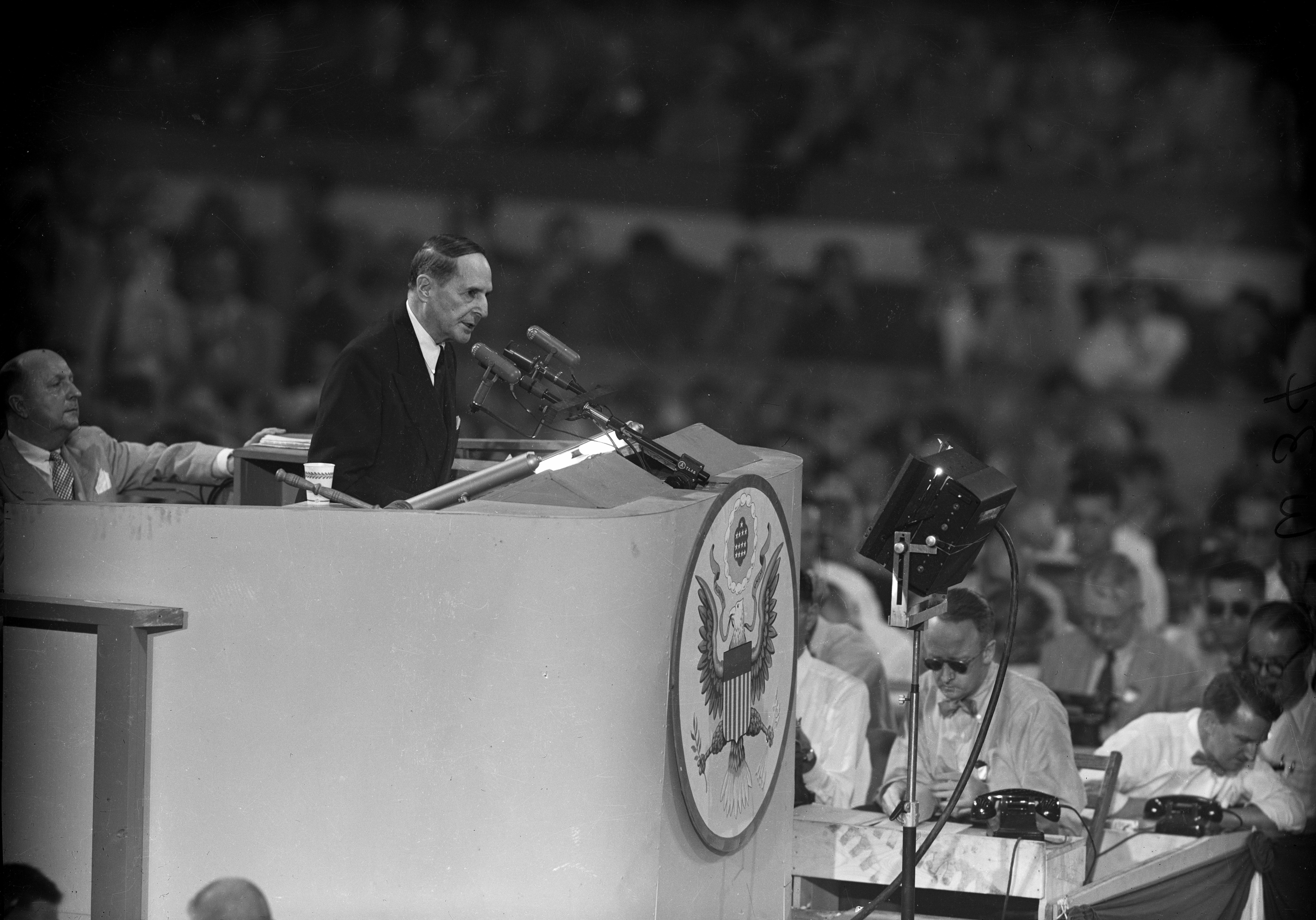
MacArthur delivering the keynote address

The keynote speech was delivered by MacArthur, who had become a hero to Republicans after President Truman relieved him of command in 1951 because of their disagreement about how to prosecute the Korean War, and had hopes of obtaining the presidential nomination. In his address, MacArthur condemned the Truman administration for America's perceived loss of status on the international stage, including criticism of the Yalta Conference and the administration's handling of the war in Korea. MacArthur also criticized Truman on the domestic front, blaming his administration for wages that failed to keep pace with post-World War II inflation.

The speech was not well received, and did nothing to aid MacArthur's presidential campaign. He curtailed his post-convention speeches and remained out of the public eye until after the election.

== Presidential nomination ==
=== Presidential candidates ===
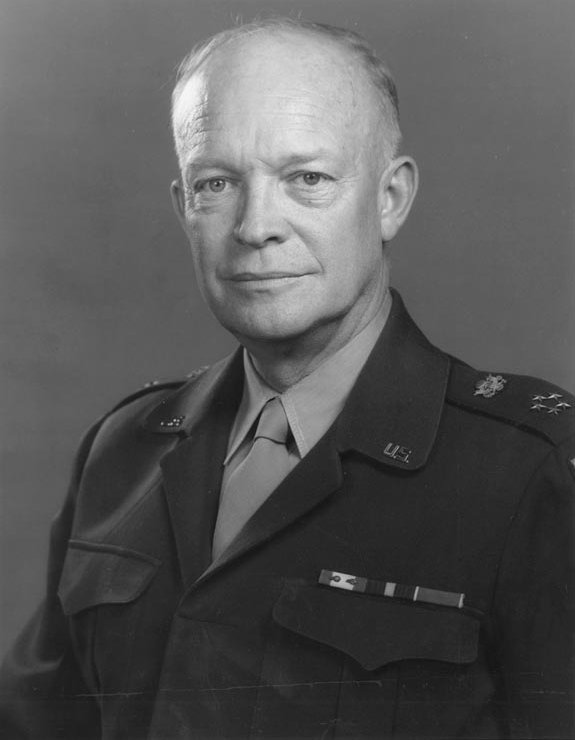
General of the Army
Dwight D. Eisenhower
of New York

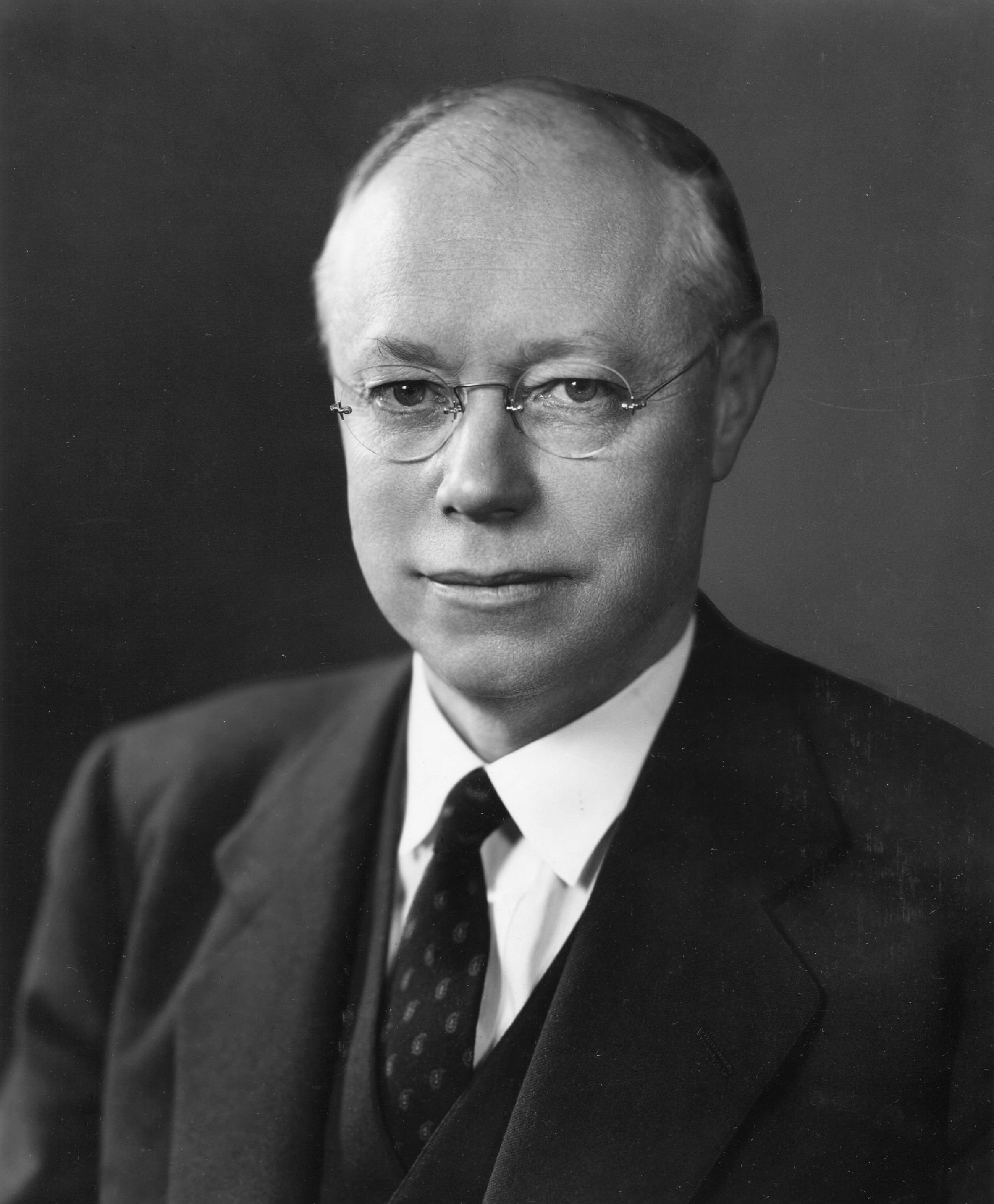
Senator
Robert A. Taft
of Ohio

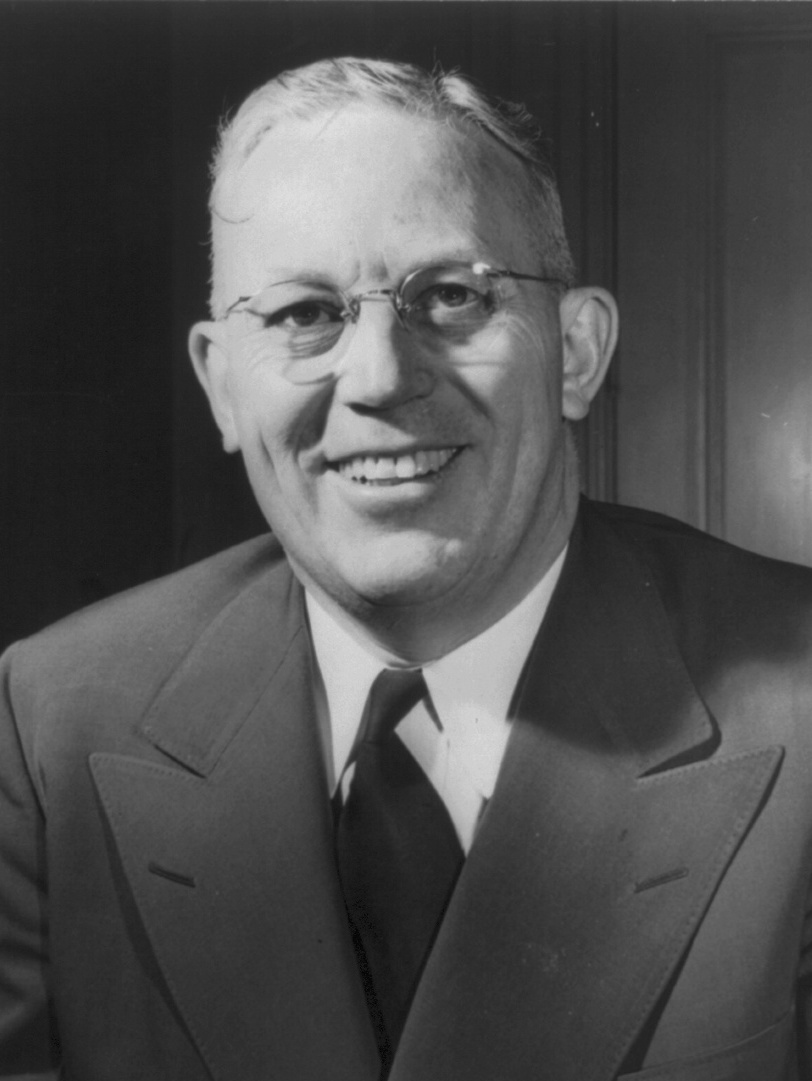
Governor
Earl Warren
of California

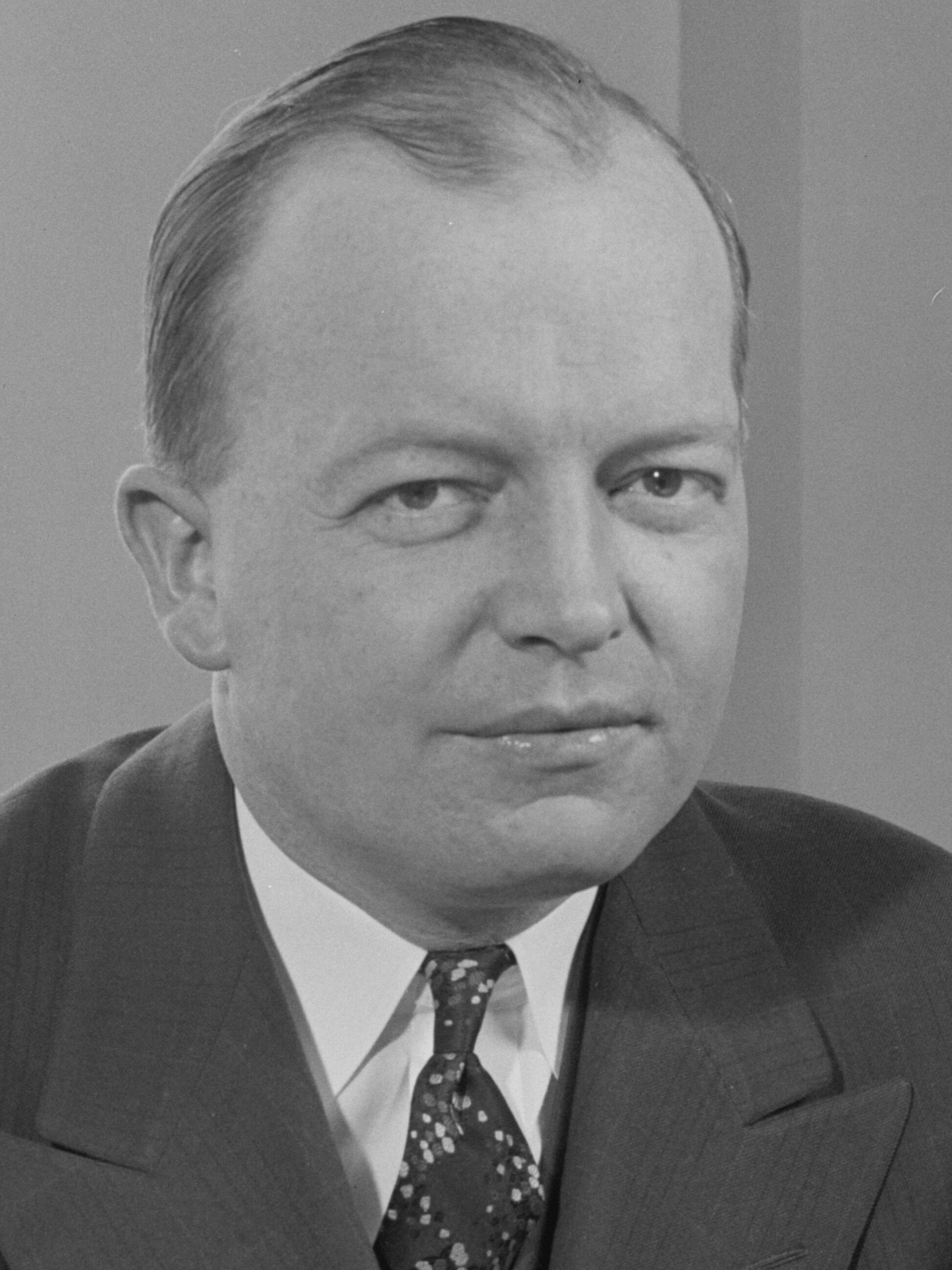
Former Governor
Harold Stassen
of Minnesota

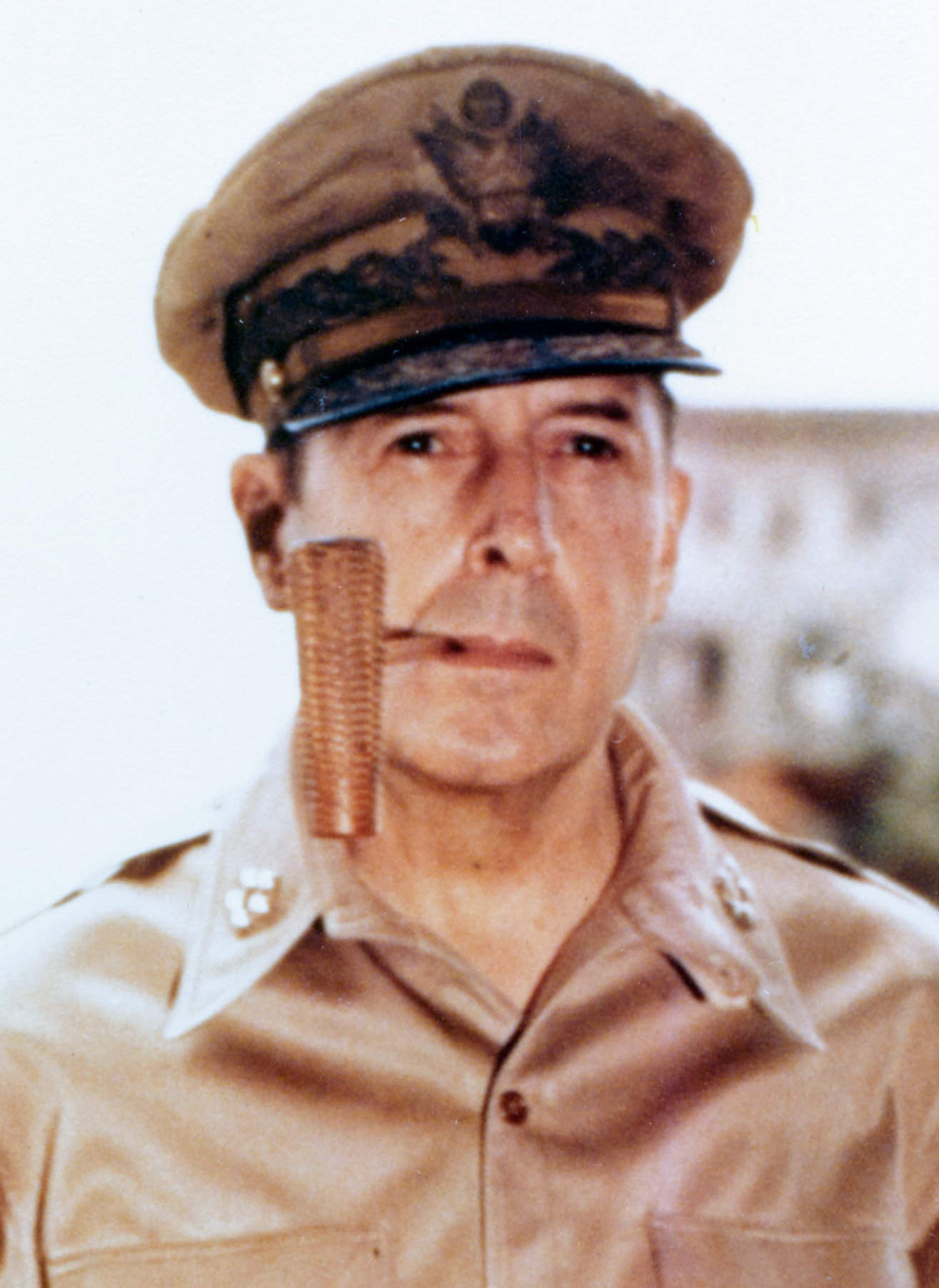
General of the Army
Douglas MacArthur
of New York

=== Withdrew before the convention ===
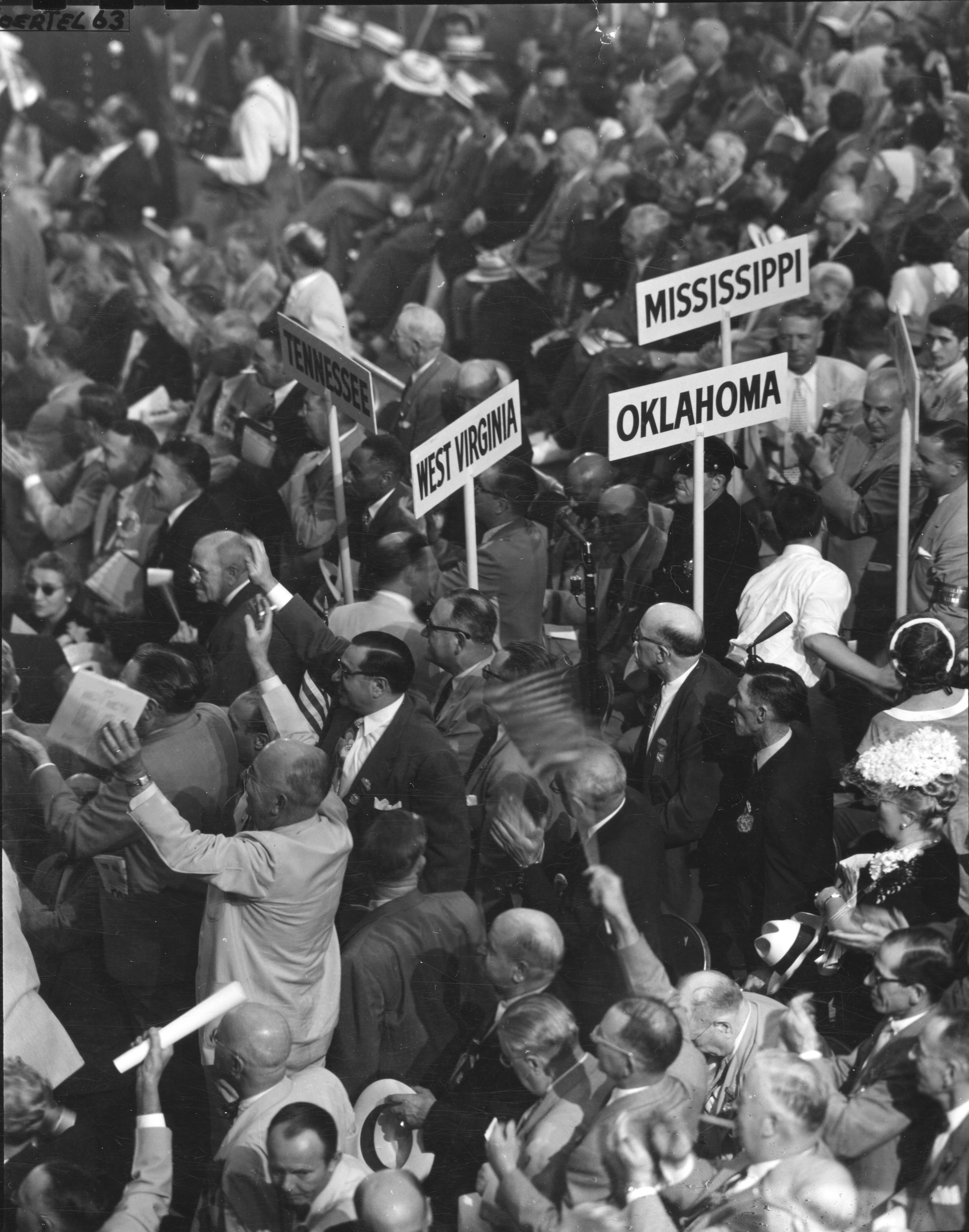
Attendees at the 1952 convention

- Businessman Riley A. Bender of Illinois
- Former Governor George T. Mickelson of South Dakota
- Representative Thomas H. Werdel of California
- Senator Wayne Morse of Oregon

=== Pre-convention delegate battles ===
The contest for the presidential nomination was expected to be a battle between the party's moderate-to-liberal and conservative wings. Moderate and liberal Republicans (the "Eastern Establishment"), led by New York Governor Thomas E. Dewey, the party's unsuccessful presidential nominee in 1944 and 1948, were largely supporters of Eisenhower or Warren. The conservative wing was led by Robert A. Taft, who had unsuccessfully tried for the presidential nomination in 1940 and 1948.

In a pre-convention fight over the seating of delegates, Eisenhower supporters charged the Taft campaign with improperly seeking to obtain delegates from Texas, Georgia and Louisiana, states that were part of the Democratic Party's "Solid South" where Republicans had little or no organization because they traditionally did not do well in general elections. The Taft-dominated Republican National Committee supported Taft in the dispute. When delegate committees met to consider the issue before the convention convened, they sustained Eisenhower's position. Stripped of 42 delegates from the disputed states, Taft's backers realized their chances of beating Eisenhower were slim.

In his remarks during the delegate fight, Taft supporter Everett Dirksen harshly criticized Dewey and the moderate-to-liberal wing of the party, which had dominated it since 1940. In describing the party's failed presidential campaigns of 1940, 1944 and 1948, he pointed at Dewey, who was seated with the New York delegation, and shouted "We followed you before and you took us down the road to defeat!" Dirksen's condemnation of Dewey touched off sustained anti-Dewey and pro-Taft demonstrations.

=== Presidential balloting on 5th day of convention (July 11) ===
Dirksen nominated Taft. Eisenhower was nominated by Maryland Governor Theodore McKeldin, who made obvious overtures to the conservative wing by mentioning Eisenhower's Midwestern Kansas roots and the fact that he had begun attendance at the United States Military Academy during the presidential administration of Robert Taft's father, William Howard Taft. McKeldin described Eisenhower's career at the highest levels of the military as evidence that he was able to assume the responsibilities of the presidency immediately and his international renown as an asset that would enable the party to unify its disparate wings and make inroads among Democratic and independent voters. McKeldin's nomination was seconded by Kansas Governor Edward F. Arn, Oregon Republican Party Chairman Robert B. Elliott, Mrs. Alberta Green, a delegate from West Plains, Missouri, and Hobson R. Reynolds, an African American funeral director, state legislator from Philadelphia, and Director of the Civil Liberties Department of the Improved Benevolent and Protective Order of Elks of the World.

After the nominations were completed, including speeches on behalf of Earl Warren, Harold Stassen, and Douglas MacArthur, the delegates proceeded to vote. After the first ballot, Eisenhower had 595 votes, nine short of the 604 required for the nomination, while Taft was a strong second with 500: Warren had 81, Stassen 20, and MacArthur 10.

Warren's backers refused to change their votes to Eisenhower because they still hoped for a deadlock that might enable Warren to obtain the nomination as a compromise choice. Stassen had not received 10% of the vote, which freed his home state of Minnesota's delegates from their pledge to support him: all but one of the Stassen delegates, led by Warren E. Burger, then changed their votes to Eisenhower, giving him 614 votes and securing him the presidential nomination. After other delegations switched to Eisenhower, the revised first ballot total was:

Presidential Balloting
Candidate	1st (Before Shifts)	1st (After Shifts)
Eisenhower	595	845
Taft	500	280
Warren	81	77
Stassen	20	0
MacArthur	10	4

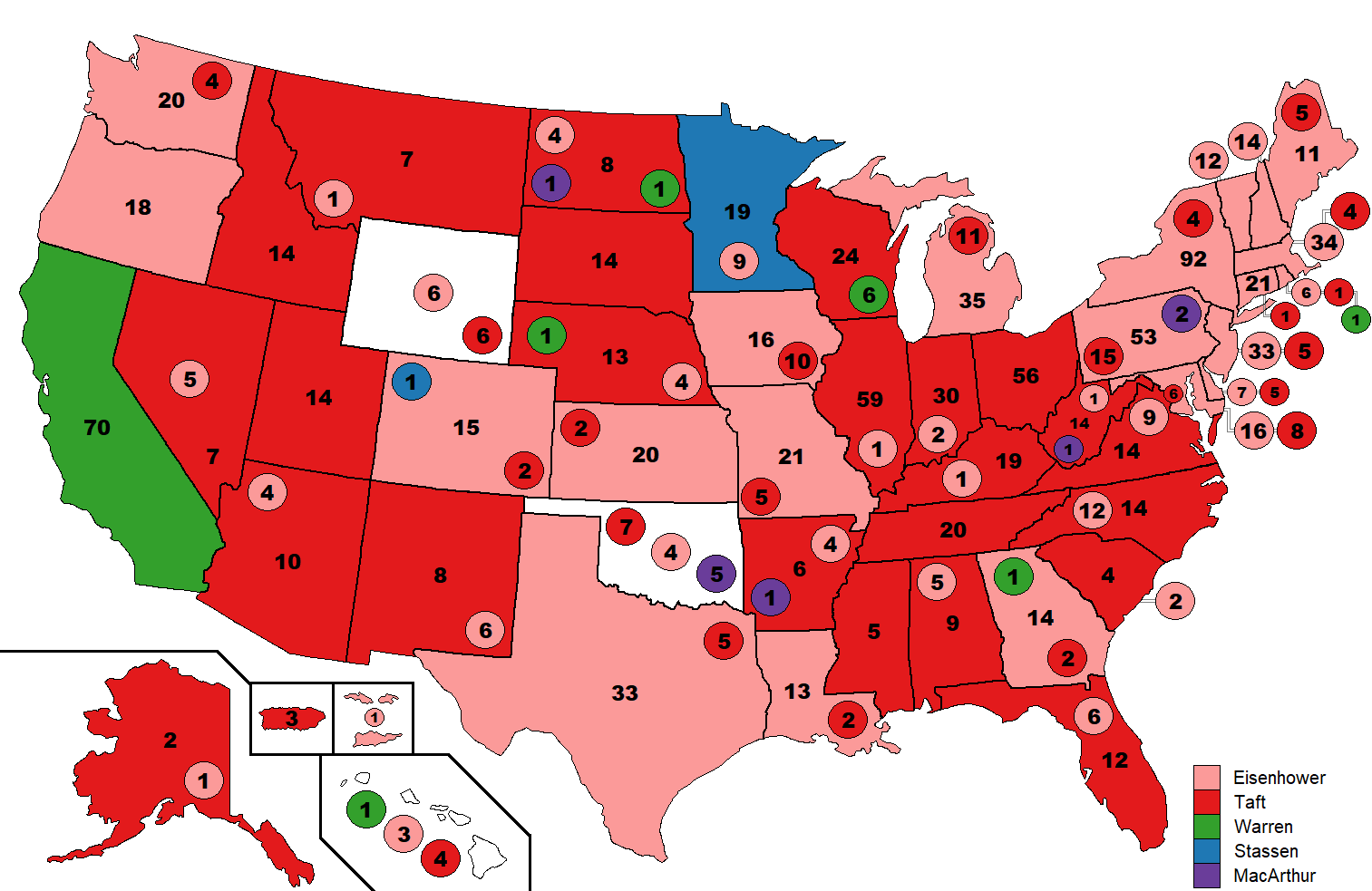
1st Presidential Ballot
(Before Shifts)

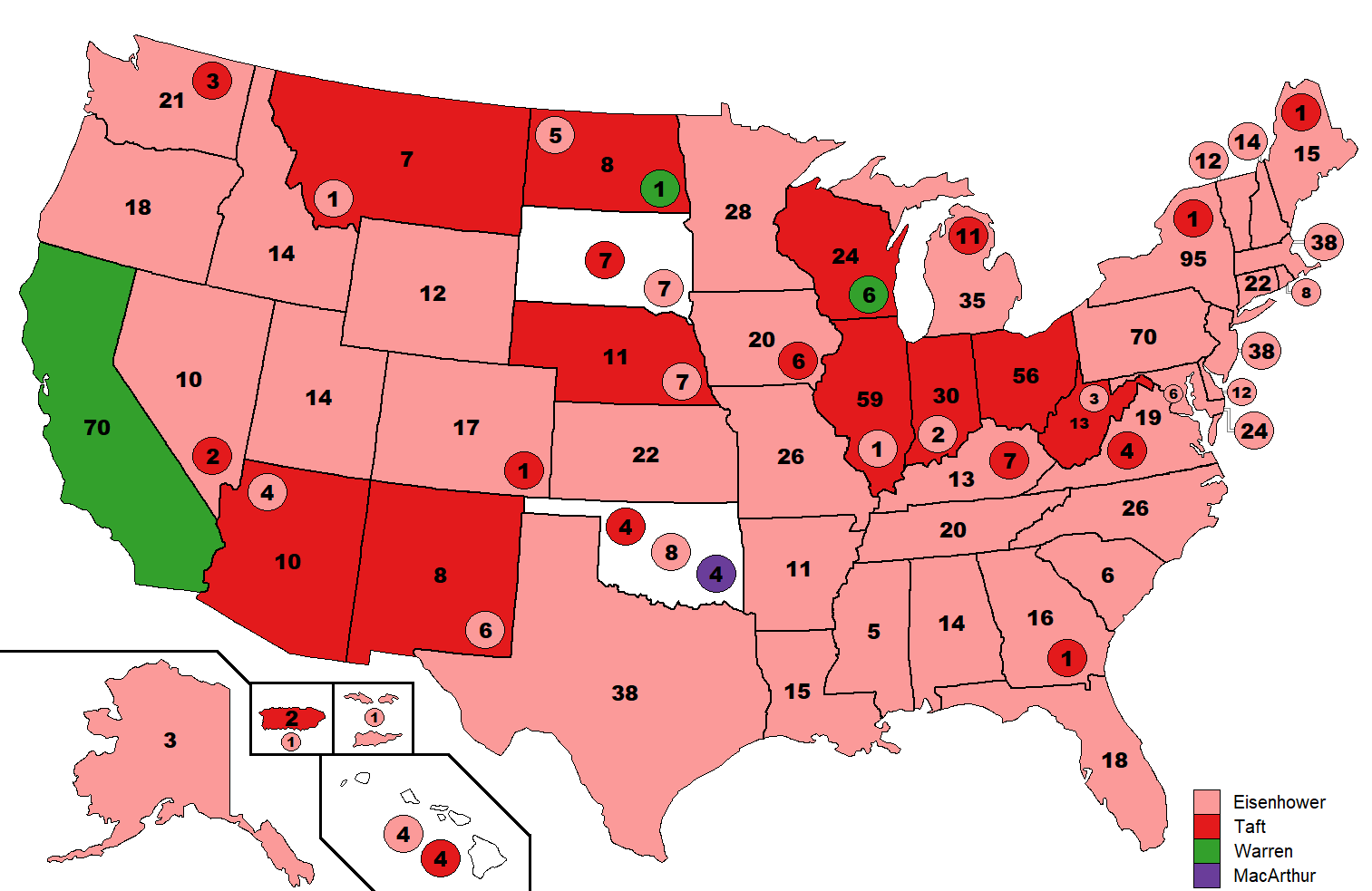
1st Presidential Ballot
(After Shifts)

After the revised totals were announced, Taft and Warren supporters moved to unanimously nominate Eisenhower, which the delegates did. As soon as Eisenhower was nominated, he visited Taft personally to request his endorsement and obtain a promise that Taft would support the Republican ticket. Taft immediately agreed, and loyally backed Eisenhower during the general election campaign.

The nomination of Eisenhower in a single round of balloting marked the fifteenth time Republicans had selected their nominee on the first ballot. In the twenty-five national conventions the party had held since 1856, the party had averaged four ballots to select its presidential nominees.

== Vice Presidential nomination ==
=== Vice presidential candidates ===
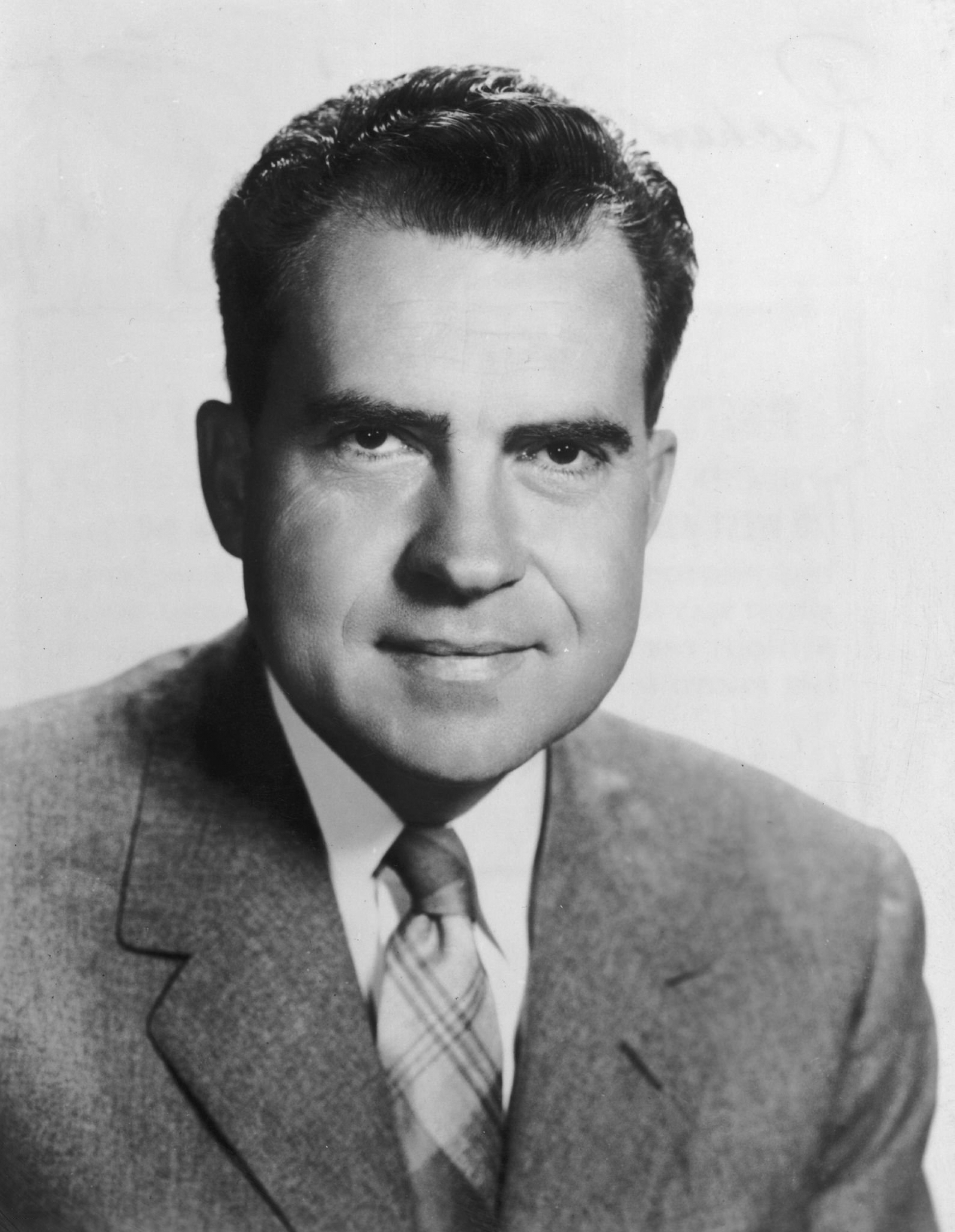
Senator
Richard Nixon
from California
(1950–1953)

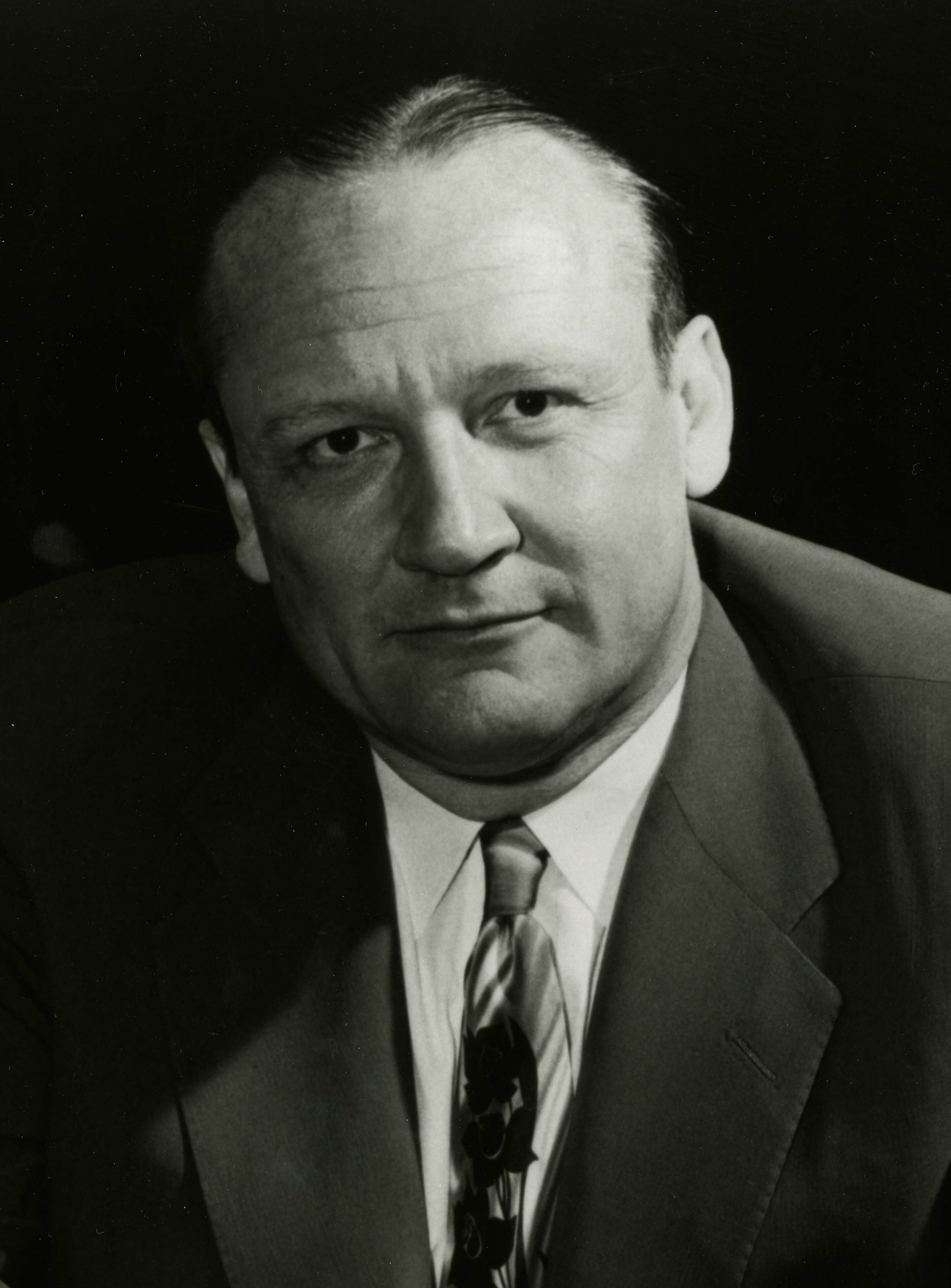
Senator
William Knowland
of California

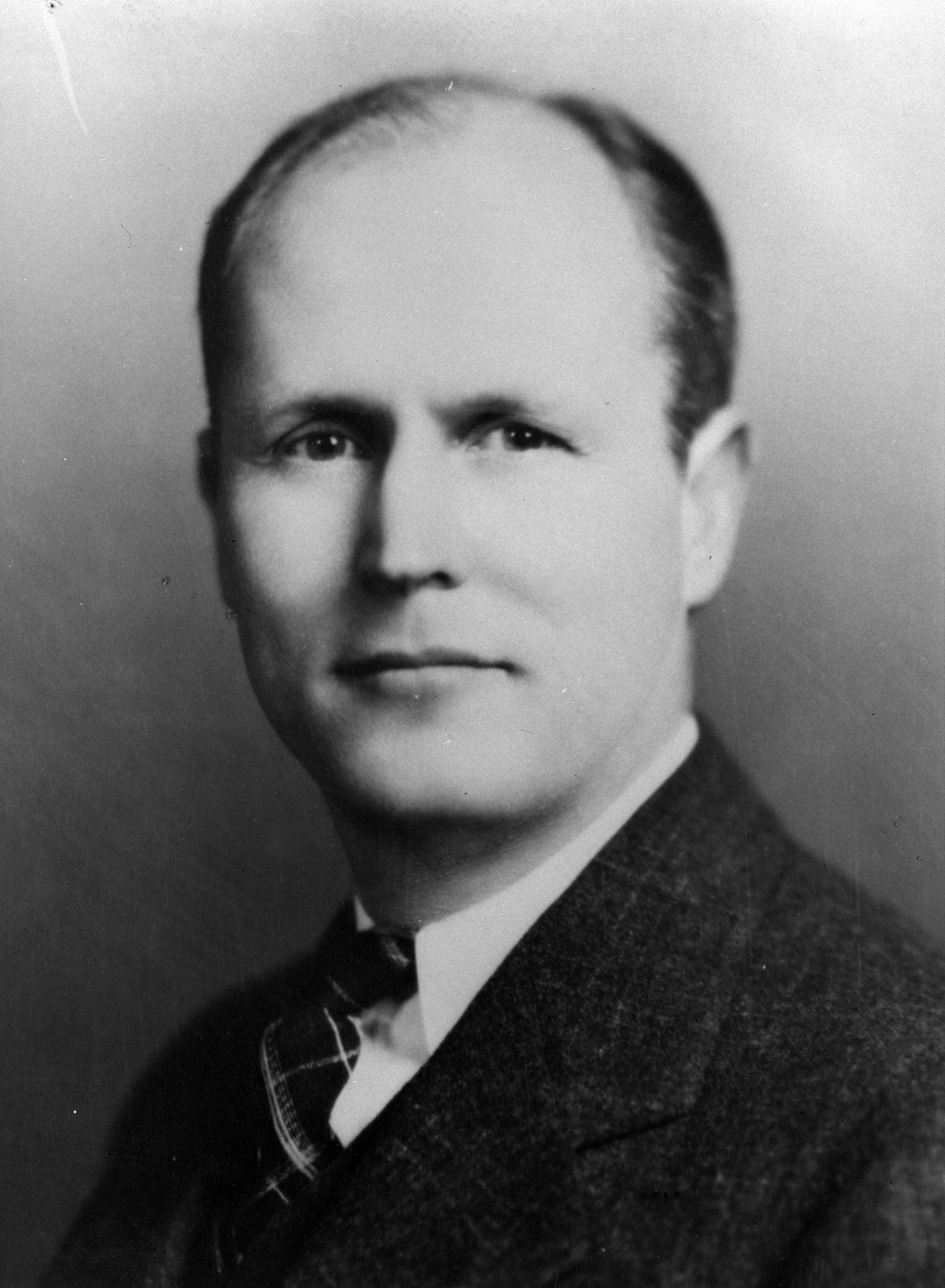
Governor
Arthur B. Langlie
of Washington

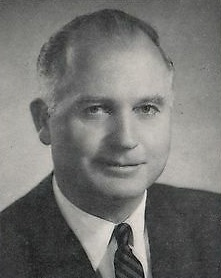
Governor
Daniel I. J. Thornton
of Colorado

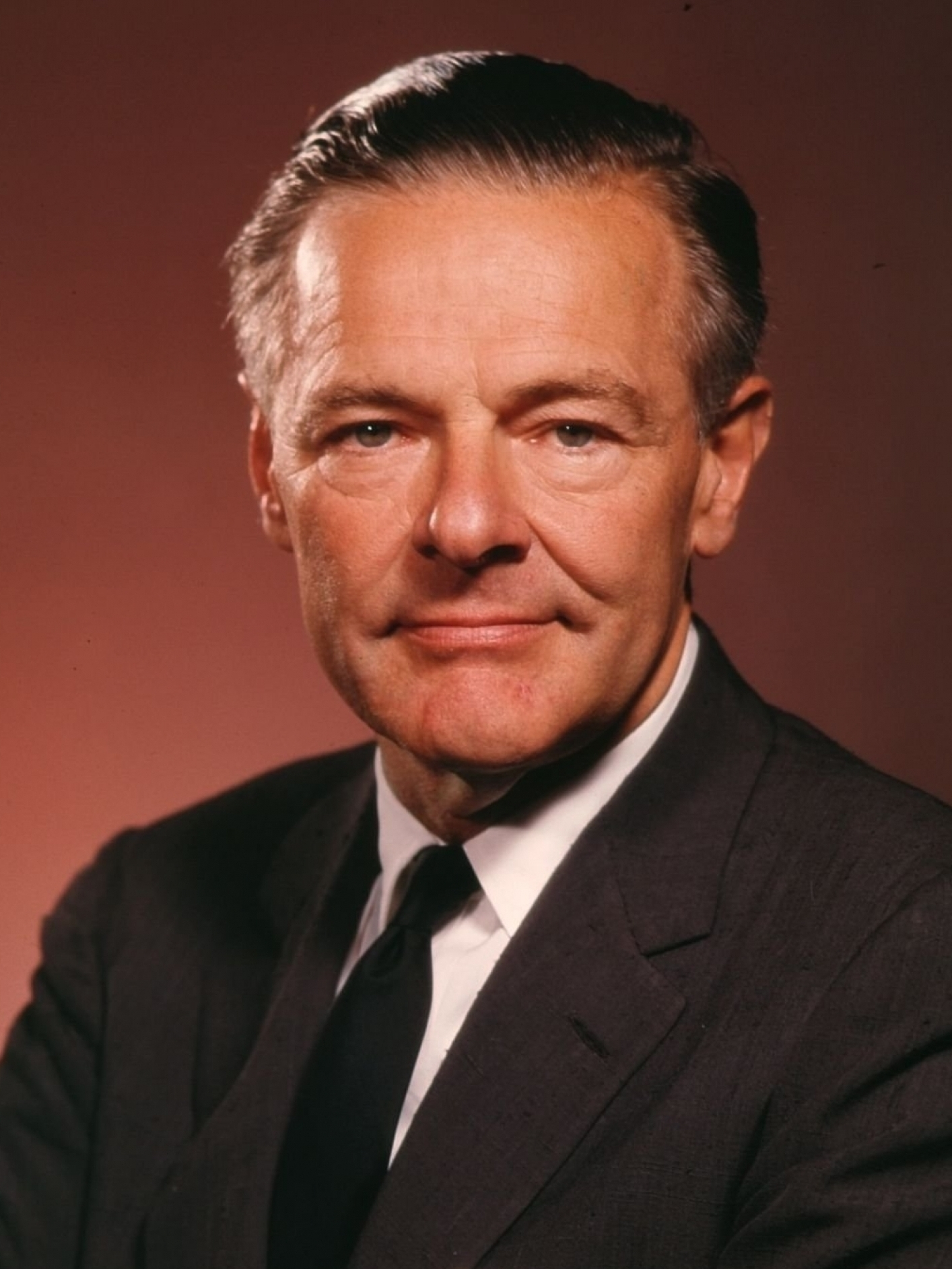
Senator
Henry Cabot Lodge Jr.
of Massachusetts

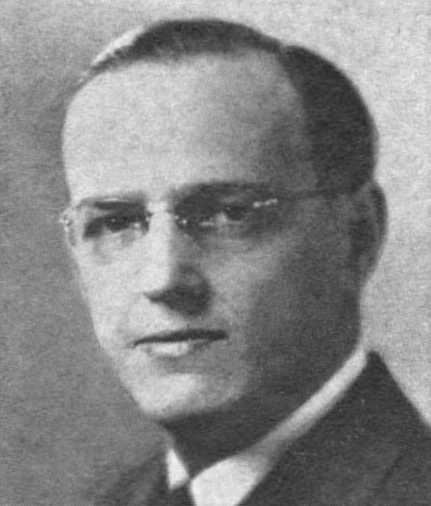
Representative
Walter Judd
of Minnesota

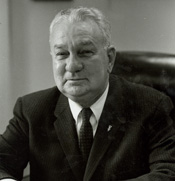
Representative
Charles A. Halleck
of Indiana

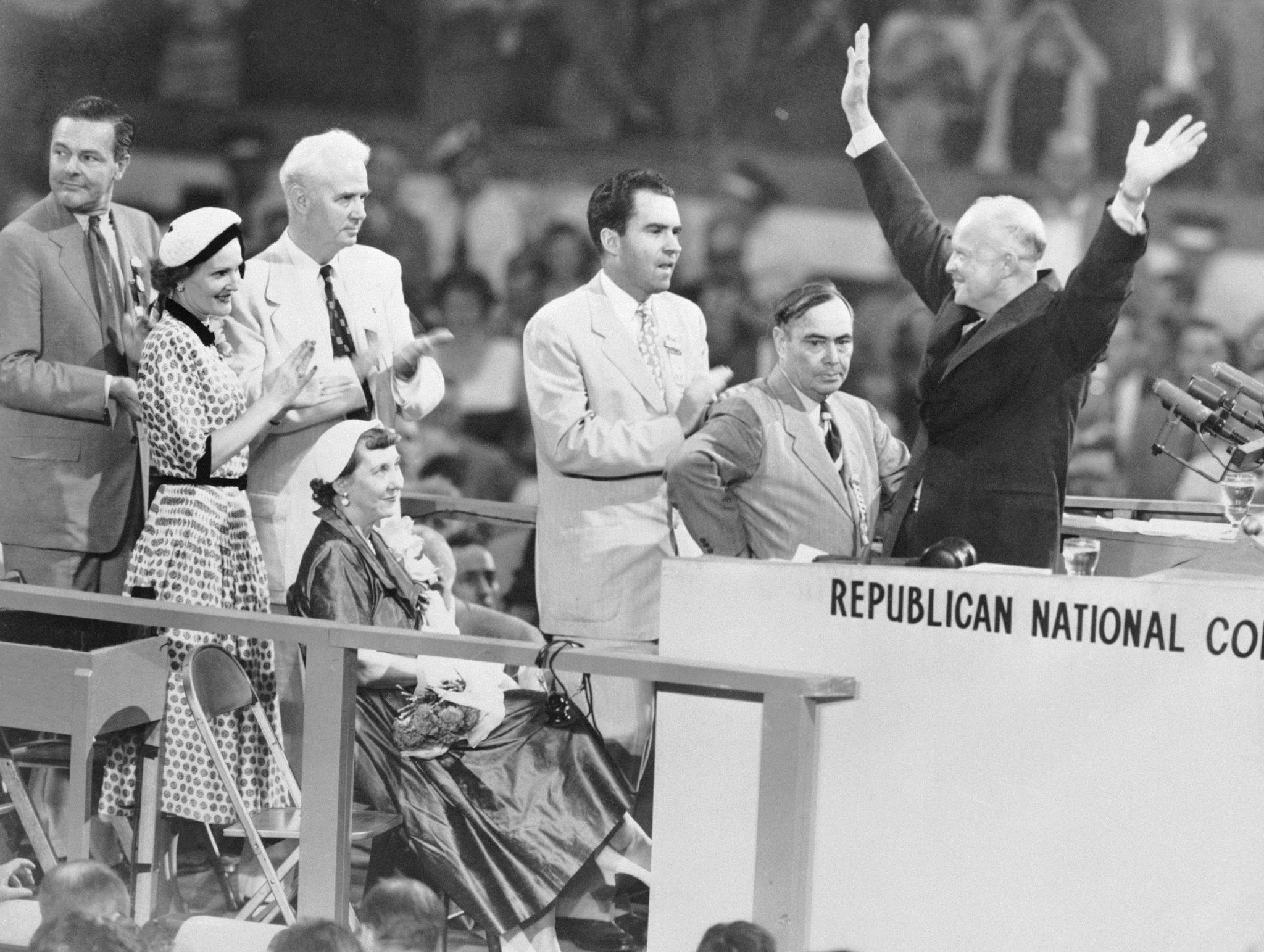
Eisenhower and Nixon stand with others on the convention hall stage

Senator Richard M. Nixon's speech at a state Republican Party fundraiser in New York City on May 8, 1952, impressed Governor Thomas E. Dewey, who was an Eisenhower supporter and had formed a pro-Eisenhower delegation from New York to attend the national convention. In a private meeting after the speech, Dewey suggested to Nixon that he would make a suitable vice presidential candidate on the ticket with Eisenhower.

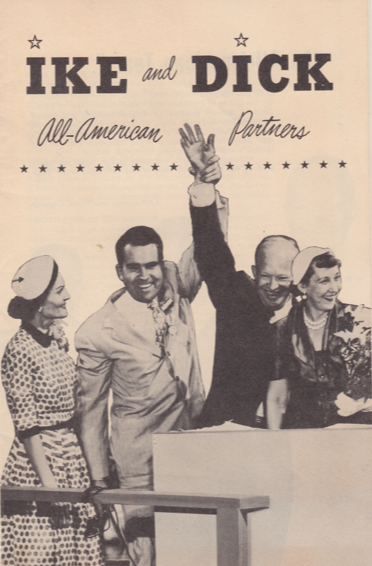
A piece of literature for the Eisenhower–Nixon campaign, 1952

Nixon attended the convention as a delegate pledged to Earl Warren and represented California on the convention's platform committee. In pre-convention remarks to reporters, Nixon touted Warren as the most prominent dark horse and suggested that if Warren was not the presidential nominee, Nixon's Senate colleague William Knowland would be a good choice for vice president. As the convention proceedings continued, Warren became concerned that Nixon was working for Eisenhower while ostensibly pledged to Warren. Warren asked Paul H. Davis of the Hoover Institution at Stanford University, who had been a vice president at Columbia University while Eisenhower was the school's president, to tell Eisenhower that Warren resented such actions and wanted them to stop. Eisenhower informed Davis that he did not oppose Warren, because if Taft and Eisenhower deadlocked, then Warren would be his first choice for the nomination. In the same conversation, Eisenhower indicated that if he won the nomination, Nixon would be his first choice for the vice presidency, because Eisenhower believed the party needed to promote leaders who were aggressive, capable, and young. Eisenhower later developed a list of seven potential candidates, with Nixon's name at the top.

After Eisenhower was nominated, his key supporters met to discuss vice presidential possibilities. Eisenhower informed the group's chairman, Herbert Brownell Jr. that he did not wish to appear to dictate to the convention by formally sponsoring a single candidate, so the group reviewed several, including Taft, Everett Dirksen, and Alfred E. Driscoll, all of whom they quickly rejected. Dewey then raised Nixon's name; the group quickly concurred. Brownell checked with Eisenhower, who indicated his approval. Brownell then called Nixon to inform him that he was Eisenhower's choice. Nixon accepted, then departed for Eisenhower's hotel room to discuss the details of the campaign and Eisenhower's plans for his vice president if the ticket was successful in the general election.

A group of women delegates (led by former congresswoman Clare Boothe Luce) had hopes of putting forward a female vice presidential candidate. This group sought to nominate Senator Margaret Chase Smith of Maine, but Smith requested that her name not be used. Noting that Eisenhower's supporters had coalesced around Nixon, Luce withdrew her nomination of Smith.

The delegates soon assembled to formalize the selection. Nixon asked Knowland to nominate him, and Knowland agreed. After Taft supporter John W. Bricker declined Nixon's request to second the nomination, Driscoll agreed to do so. There were no other candidates, and Nixon was nominated by acclamation.

== Protests ==
During the convention, Faith Johnson (a member of the group "New York City Youth for Eisenhower") steered a steamroller down Michigan Avenue up to the Conrad Hilton Hotel (the headquarters hotel of the convention) in order to protest "steamroller" tactics she accused Taft's supporters of utilizing in the fight for the nomination.

The Radio Writers Guild and Authors League of America, an independent New York trade union, launched a strike against NBC, ABC, and CBS the week prior to the Republican convention. To bring attention to their strike, the union picketed on July 5 outside of the Conrad Hilton Hotel (at which those companies had television and radio facilities). NBC and ABC noted that there coverage would not be impacted by strike because their Chicago-area employees were a member of the National Association of Broadcast Engineers and Technicians (a separate union). CBS also noted that the strike would not impact their television or radio coverage.

== See also ==
- History of the United States Republican Party
- List of Republican National Conventions
- 1952 Democratic National Convention
- United States presidential nominating convention
- 1952 United States presidential election

Preceded by 1948; Philadelphia, Pennsylvania	Republican National Conventions	Succeeded by 1956; San Francisco, California
