= Hallanan =

Hallanan is a surname. Notable people with the surname include:

- Elizabeth Virginia Hallanan (1925–2004), American judge
- Walter S. Hallanan (1889/1890–1962), West Virginia politician
