= Piqué (surname) =

As a surname, Piqué may refer to:

- Gerard Piqué (born 1987), Spanish footballer
- Josep Piqué (1955–2023), Spanish politician and businessman
- Lorenzo Piqué (born 1990), Dutch footballer
- Marco Piqué (born 1980), Dutch-Surinamese kickboxer
- Mitchell Piqué (born 1979), Dutch footballer

== See also ==
- Piquer (surname)
- Piquet
