= Kickert =

Kickert is a surname. Notable people with the surname include:

- Daniel Kickert (born 1983), Australian basketball player
- Jan Kickert (born 1964), Austrian Permanent Representative to the United Nations
- Walter Kickert (born 1950), Dutch academic, and Professor of Public Management

== See also ==
- Kickett
