= French frigate Cumberland (1747) =

History

Great Britain
- Name: Duke of Cumberland
- Namesake: Duke of Cumberland
- Builder: England

France
- Name: Cumberland
- Fate: Retired in 1758

France
- Name: Mars
- Fate: Lost in late 1758 or 1759.

General characteristics
- Class & type: East Indiaman
- Tons burthen: 250 or 499(bm)
- Length: 33.1 metres
- Beam: 8.4 metres
- Depth of hold: 4.4 metres
- Propulsion: Sail
- Complement: 4 officers and 110 to 180 men
- Armament: 20 × 6-pounder guns or 8-pounder guns; 4 × 4-pounder guns

Cumberland (or Duc de Cumberland) was a 24-gun frigate of the French Navy, originally the East Indiaman Duke of Cumberland.

== Career ==
On 21 June 1747, the frigates Mutine and Galatée captured Duke of Cumberland off Groix. She was then brought into French naval service as Cumberland.

On 24 February 1748, Cumberland departed for Isle de France and Ile Bourbon under Captain Mézédern, and with La Motte-Picquet as her first officer. After she had called at A Coruña, Cumberland encountered a British 36-gun frigate, leading to an inconclusive battle where she lost 25 killed or wounded. After a 122-day voyage, Cumberland reached Île Bourbon, and then Île de France. From there, she departed for a cruise off India on 20 October 1748.

On 9 February 1749, she arrived at Pondichery with the squadron under Suffren.

In March 1758, the Navy sold her in Brest to a particular for use as the merchantman Mars. She was lost in late 1758 or 1759.
