= Pigot (East Indiaman) =

Two vessels with the name Pigot have served the British East India Company (EIC).

- Pigot (1763 EIC ship), of 76686/94 tons (bm), was laid down in 1757 and launched by Wells, Deptford, on 3 February 1763. She made four voyages for the EIC between 1765 and 1773. Lloyd's Register for 1776 (supplemental pages), describes Pigot, laid down 1757, of 700 tons, launched on the River, with A. Hutton, master, Jn Durand, owner, and trade London transport. Between 1776 and 1779, her owners hired her out as an armed escort ship and transport. They then sold her to Calvert & Co., London, who renamed her York. Calvert & Co. resold her in March to the Royal Navy, which took her into service as the 14-gun storeship HMS York. In 1781 York was sold to local buyers in India. Lloyd's Register for 1782 shows York (ex-Pigot) with owner Calvert & Co., master R. Brewer, trade Cork transport, and armament as 20 × 9 and 6 × 6-pounder guns.
- Pigot (1780 Indiaman) was launched in 1780. She made five voyages to India, China, and the East Indies for the EIC. On her fifth voyage, in 1794, the French captured her at Bencoolen.

The EIC was having a third Pigot built in 1795, but the British Royal Navy purchased her while she was on the stocks and took her into service as HMS Lancaster.
