= Piquer =

Piquer is a Spanish surname, and may refer to:

- Andrés Piquer (1711–1772), Spanish physician, philosopher, logician and writer
- Bernardo López Piquer (1799–1874), Spanish painter
- Concha Piquer (1908–1990), Spanish singer
- Francisco Piquer Chanza (1922–2009), Spanish actor
- Juan Piquer Simón (1935-2011), Spanish film director
- Vicente Piquer (1935-2018), Spanish retired footballer

== See also ==
- Piqué (surname)
