= Pickett (disambiguation) =

Pickett is a surname.

Pickett may also refer to a place in the United States:

- Pickett, Kentucky
- Pickett, Oklahoma
- Pickett, Wisconsin
- Pickett County, Tennessee
- Fort Barfoot, Virginia (formerly Fort Pickett)

== See also ==
- Picket (disambiguation)
- Picquet (disambiguation)
- Piquet (disambiguation)
- Piquette (disambiguation)
