= French ship La Motte-Picquet =

Four ships of the French Navy have been named in honour of the 18th century admiral count Toussaint-Guillaume Picquet de la Motte.

== French ships named La Motte-Picquet ==
- French aviso La Motte-Picquet (1859), a sail and steam aviso
- French ship La Motte-Picquet (1919), a coastal transport
- La Motte-Picquet-class cruiser (1912), the planned leadship and cancelled class of light cruiser
- French cruiser La Motte-Picquet (1923), a Duguay-Trouin-class cruiser.
- French frigate La Motte-Picquet (D645), an F70 type anti-submarine frigate
Ships of the French Navy named La Motte-Picquet
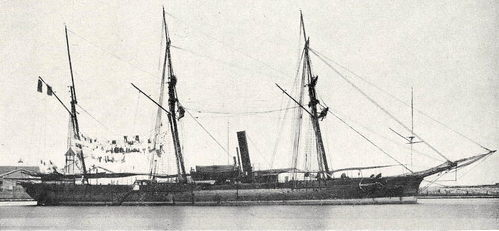
La Motte-Picquet (1859)

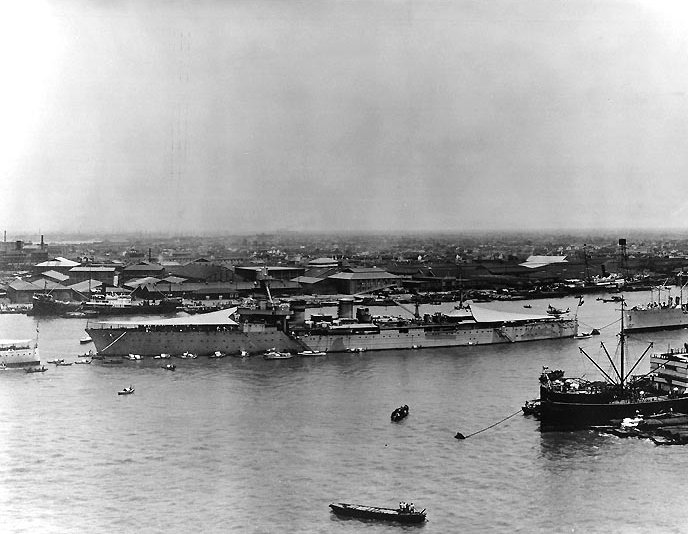
La Motte-Picquet (1923)

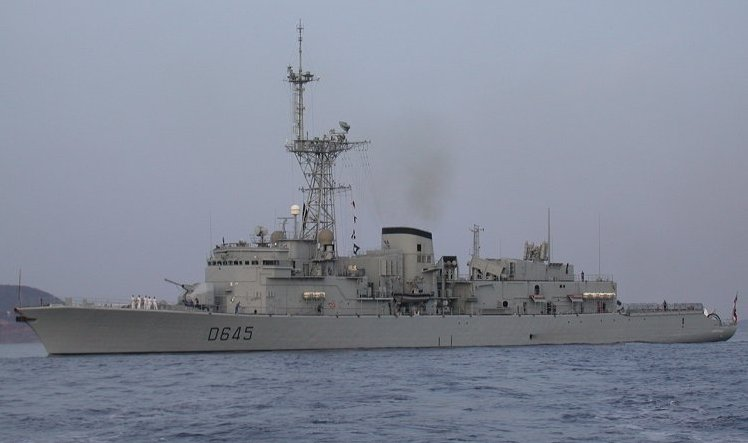
La Motte-Picquet (D645)

== Notes and references ==
=== Bibliography ===
- Roche, Jean-Michel (2005). Dictionnaire des bâtiments de la flotte de guerre française de Colbert à nos jours. Vol. 1. Group Retozel-Maury Millau. ISBN 978-2-9525917-0-6. OCLC 165892922.
- Roche, Jean-Michel (2005). Dictionnaire des bâtiments de la flotte de guerre française de Colbert à nos jours. Vol. 2. Group Retozel-Maury Millau. ISBN 978-2-9525917-0-6. OCLC 165892922.
