= Piquette (disambiguation) =

Piquette is a type of wine made from pomace.

Piquette may also refer to:

- Ford Piquette Avenue Plant, a Ford Motor Company automobile production plant
- Léo Piquette (born 1946), member of the Alberta Legislative Assembly

== See also ==
- Picket (disambiguation)
- Pickett (disambiguation)
- Picquet (disambiguation)
- Piquet (disambiguation)
