= Walter S. Hallanan =

American politician

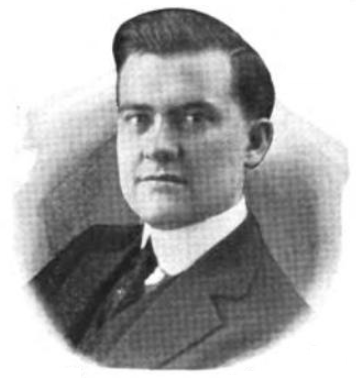

Member of the West Virginia Senate
- In office 1926–1930

Personal details
- Born: 1890
- Died: December 28, 1962 (aged 72) Charleston, West Virginia
- Resting place: Spring Hill Cemetery
- Party: Republican
- Spouse: Imogene Hallanan
- Children: 2
- Occupation: Journalist, oil executive, politician

Walter S. Hallanan (1890 – December 28, 1962) was a West Virginia political figure who served as temporary chairman of the 1952 Republican National Convention and vice-chairman of the Republican National Committee. He was named West Virginian of the Year for 1952. An oilman, he was installed as temporary convention chairman by his fellow supporters of Sen. Robert A. Taft, however Taft went on to lose the nomination to Dwight D. Eisenhower.

Earlier in his career, Hallanan edited the Huntington Herald-Dispatch newspaper and served as West Virginia's state Tax Commissioner. He was elected to one term in the West Virginia Senate in 1926. After being defeated for re-election to the Senate, Hallanan was elected to serve as West Virginia's Republican National Committeeman in 1928. He remained an RNC member until his death in Charleston on December 28, 1962. He was buried in Spring Hill Cemetery.
