= Picket fence (disambiguation) =

Picket fence is a type of wooden fence.

Picket fence may also refer to:

- Picket fence (electronics), a shielding structure used in electronics
- Picket Fences, a television series
