= Georges Picot =

French lawyer and historian (1838–1909)

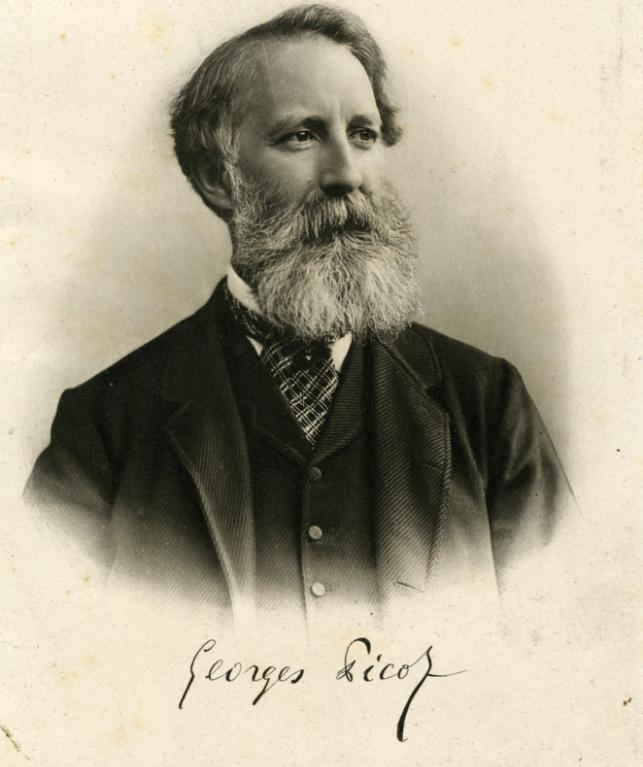
Georges Picot

Georges Marie René Picot (French: [ʒɔʁʒ piko]; 24 December 1838 – 16 August 1909) was a French lawyer and historian.

His main work is Histoire des États généraux for which he twice gained the prize of the French Academy in 1873 and 1874.

== Biography ==
Georges Picot was born in Paris, son of Charles Picot (Orléans, 4 August 1795 – Paris, 31 January 1870) and his wife Henriette Bidois (Paris, 1799 – Paris, 19 November 1862). He married in Saint-Bouize on 19 June 1865 with Marie Adélaïde Marthe Bachasson de Montalivet (Paris, 9 October 1844 – Paris, 2 August 1914), daughter of Marthe Camille Bachasson, Count of Montalivet and, according to some (though disputed by many) a great-granddaughter of King Louis XV by one of his mistresses, Catherine Éléonore Bénard (1740–1769).

He had seven children, the third of whom was the diplomat François Georges-Picot, and the fifth, Geneviève Picot, was the maternal grandmother of Valéry Giscard d'Estaing. Through his son Charles, he was a grandfather of Jacques Georges-Picot, chairman of Suez Canal Company.

He died in Allevard-les-Bains.

== Works ==
- Histoire des États généraux: considérés au point de vue de leur influence sur le gouvernement de la France de 1355 à 1614. – Paris, 1872 (4 vols.) – online: Band 1, Tom. 2, Tom. 3, Tom. 4 (2me édition, revue et augmentée en cinq volumes. Paris: Hachette, 1888)
- Socialisme et devoir social. – Paris : A. Picard, 1890
- L’Usage de la liberté. – Paris, 1893
- La Lutte contre le socialisme révolutionnaire. – Paris: A. Colin, 1895 Document électronique
- Notice historique sur la vie et les travaux de Jules Simon: lue dans la séance publique annuelle de l’Académie des sciences morales et politiques du 5 décembre 1896. – Paris: Firmin Didot, 1896 Document électronique
- Barthélemy Saint-Hilaire : notice historique. – Paris: Hachette, 1899 Document électronique
- Gladstone. – Paris, 1904
