= Pickett, Kentucky =

Unincorporated community in Kentucky, United States

Pickett
- Unincorporated community
- Location within the state of Kentucky Pickett (the United States)
- Coordinates: 37°7′21″N 85°28′32″W
- Country: United States
- State: Kentucky
- County: Adair
- Elevation: 676 ft (206 m)
- Time zone: UTC-6 (Central (CST))
  - Summer (DST): UTC-5 (CDT)
- GNIS feature ID: 508816

Pickett is an unincorporated community in Adair County, Kentucky, United States. Its elevation is 676 feet (206 m).
