= John Pickett =

John Pickett may refer to:

- John Pickett (businessman) (born 1934), American businessman and owner of the New York Islanders
- John Pickett (baseball) (1866–1922), American baseball player
- John Coleman Pickett (1896–1983), American federal judge
- John Pickett (canoeist) (born 1951), American sprint canoeist
- John A. Pickett (born 1945), British chemist
- John S. Pickett Jr. (1920–2014), American legislator and judge
