= Hugh Pigot =

Hugh Pigot may refer to:

- Hugh Pigot (Royal Navy officer, born 1722) (1722–1792), admiral and commander-in-chief of the Royal Navy's West Indian fleet from 1782
- Hugh Pigot (Royal Navy officer, born 1769) (1769–1797), his son, brutal officer, killed by his own men during the mutiny on HMS Hermione
- Hugh Pigot (Royal Navy officer, born 1775) (1775–1857), the nephew and cousin of the above, commander-in-chief at Cork 1844-1847
