= Hugh Pickett =

Canadian theatre manager

Hugh Frank Digby Pickett, CM (April 11, 1913 – February 13, 2006) was a Canadian impresario who made major contributions to Vancouver's arts and entertainment scene.

Born in Vancouver, British Columbia, he was a manager and press agent with Theatre Under the Stars.

In 1986, he was made a Member of the Order of Canada in recognition for his involvement with "Vancouver's famed Theatre Under The Stars".
