= Toussaint-Guillaume Picquet de la Motte =

French Navy officer (1720–1791)

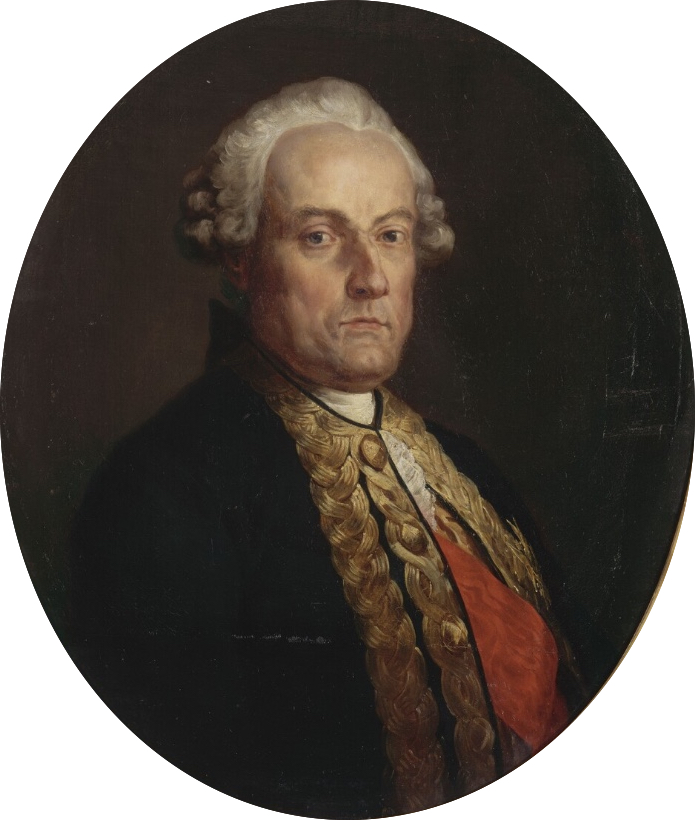
- Portrait by Jean-Pierre Franque, 1839
- Born: 1 July 1720; Rennes, France
- Died: 10 June 1791 (aged 70); Brest, France
- Military career
- Allegiance: France
- Branch: French Navy
- Service years: 1735–1787
- Rank: Lieutenant général des armées navales
- Commands: Renommée; Solitaire; Robuste; Saint-Esprit; Annibal
- Conflicts: War of the Austrian Succession; Seven Years' War; American Revolutionary War; Battle of Ushant (1778); Battle of Grenada; Siege of Savannah; Battle of Martinique (1779)
- Awards: Grand Cross of the Order of Saint Louis

Lieutenant général des armées navales Toussaint-Guillaume Picquet de la Motte (Note: In the 18th century, spelling could vary and the name is sometimes spelt "Piquet" and "La Mothe") (1 November 1720 – 10 June 1791) was a French Navy officer. Over a career spanning 50 years, he served under Louis XV and Louis XVI and took part in 34 military engagements. He fought in the Seven Years' War and the American Revolutionary War, earning the ranks of Commandeur in the Order of Saint Louis in 1780, and of Grand Cross in 1784. He died during the French Revolution.

== Early life and naval career ==
Toussaint-Guillaume Picquet de la Motte was born on 1 November 1720 in Rennes, France. He joined the Gardes de la Marine in Brest on 11 July 1735, then aged 15. Two years later, he served on the frigate Vénus in a campaign against the Barbary corsairs of Salé. On 1 January 1743, he rose to sous-brigadier des gardes de la marine, and then to aide d'artillerie on 10 December, after serving in two campaigns in the English Channel and off Ireland on Mercure, under Dubois de La Motte, in a squadron under Roquefeuil.

In January 1745, during the War of the Austrian Succession, after having conducted nine campaigns off Morocco, in the Baltic Sea and in the Caribbean, he transferred on the frigate Renommée, under Captain Guy François de Kersaint. On 6 February 1745, Renommée departed Brest to ferry despatches to Louisbourg, then blockaded by the Royal Navy. Taking advantage of the fog and the ice that hindered the British, the frigate managed to anchor at Baie des Castors, where she fought off several smaller British ships. On 16 June 1746, on her third trip from Canada, Renommée met a British squadron under Admiral George Anson. In the ensuing battle, Kersaint was gravely wounded and La Motte-Picquet took command, managing to escape to Port-Louis. La Motte-Picquet himself had his cheek cut away by a cannonball.

On 24 February 1748, La Motte-Picquet departed Brest as first officer on the 24-gun frigate Cumberland, under Captain Mézédern, bound for Île-de-France and Ile Bourbon. After calling A Coruña, Cumberland encountered a British 36-gun frigate, leading to an inconclusive battle where the French lost 25 killed or wounded. After a 122-day travel, Cumberland reached Bourbon, and then Île-de-France. From there, she departed for a cruise off India on 20 October 1748. Peace being restored in October 1748 with the Treaty of Aix-la-Chapelle, La Motte-Picquet cruised in the Caribbean, in the Atlantic and the Indian Ocean. In 1754, he rose to the rank of Lieutenant de Vaisseau.

== Seven Years' War ==
In 1755, La Motte-Picquet earned his first command. In October 1756, he was made a Knight in the Order of Saint-Louis. In 1757, La Motte-Picquet was part of the staff of the 74-gun Diadème, under Captain Rosily-Méros, part of the squadron under Dubois de La Motte tasked to engage the British off Québec. In 1758, he fought off Fort de Portzic in Brest Roads, and had to report his actions before the Secretary of State for the Navy Arnouville. (Note: Lettre du 9 août 1758, au Ministre de la marine : "Il serait bien facheux pour moy, après 24 ans de services, dans lesquels je n'ay jamais donné la moindre prise sur ma conduite, qu'une occasion… qui, j'ose le dire, me fait honneur… vous laissât quelques mauvaises impressions sur mon compte …") In 1760, he was on convoy escort duty between Brest and Rochefort. In 1762, he was promoted to captain and appointed to Diadème. After the Peace of Paris in 1763, La Motte-Picquet served in squadrons under Admiral d'Orvilliers and Duchaffaut. In September 1763, he was given command of the 32-gun frigate Malicieuse to undertake a 6-month cruise off Canada. In the next years, he conducted several raids against the Salé Rovers. In 1772, commanding the 16-gun corvette Cerf-Volant, he distinguished himself in a training squadron under Orvilliers. In 1776, he was given command of the 64-gun ship of the line Solitaire, with Louis Philippe II, Duke of Orléans as a notable participant.

== American Revolutionary War ==
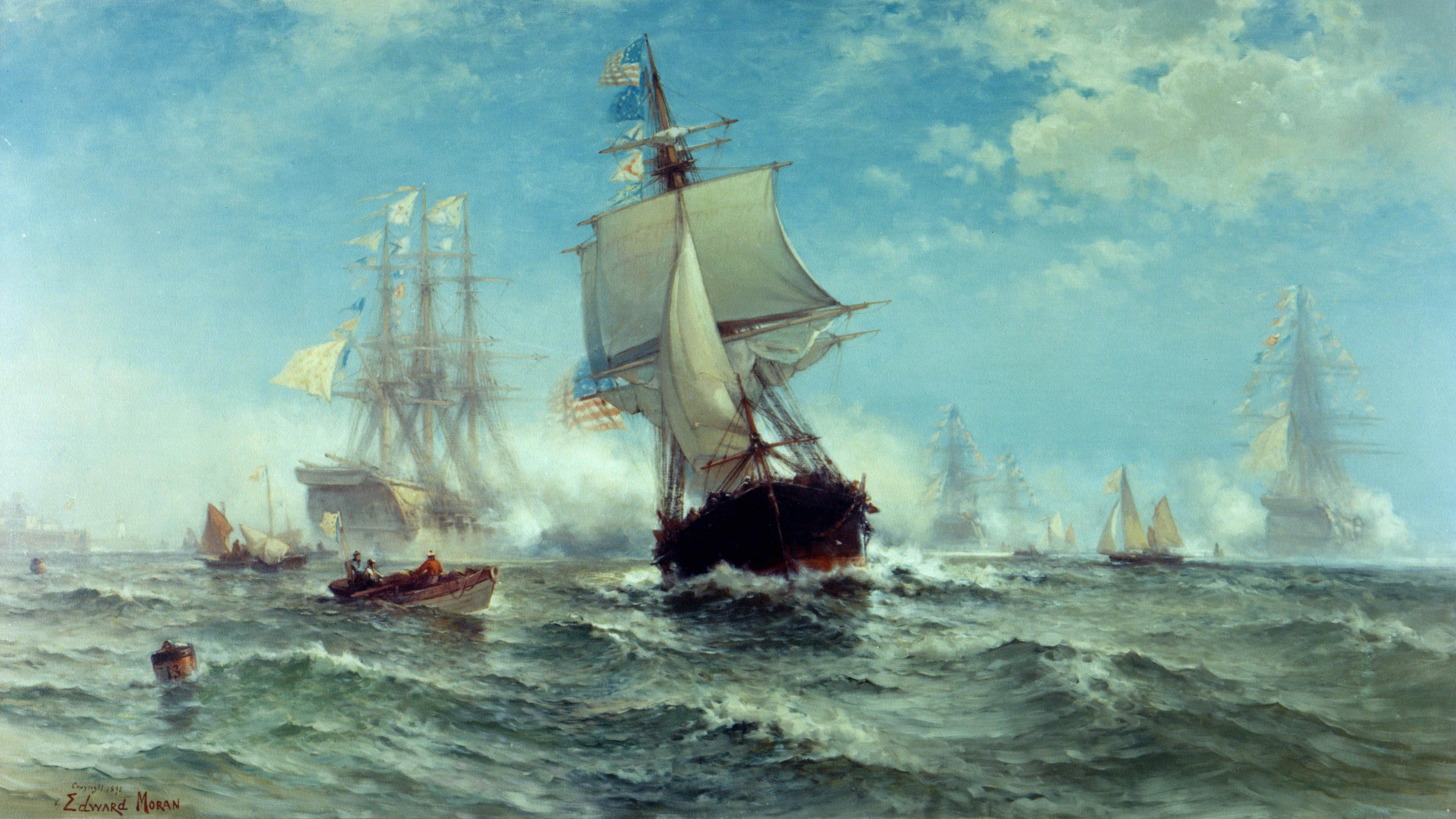
1898 painting by Edward Moran, depicting Robuste firing her nine-gun salute for the US flag on USS Ranger.

In June 1777, Lamotte-Picquet commanded the 74-gun Robuste. On 14 February 1778, he fired a nine-gun salute for USS Ranger, marking the first time a foreign warship recognised the US flag. In 1778, as a Squadron Commander, he took part in the Battle of Ouessant on the Saint-Esprit, and then cruised the English seas. During one month, he captured thirteen ships. During the American Revolutionary War, Picquet de la Motte distinguished himself as a member of Admiral Charles Henri Hector, Count of Estaing's squadron in Martinique, during the Battle of Grenada, and the Siege of Savannah.

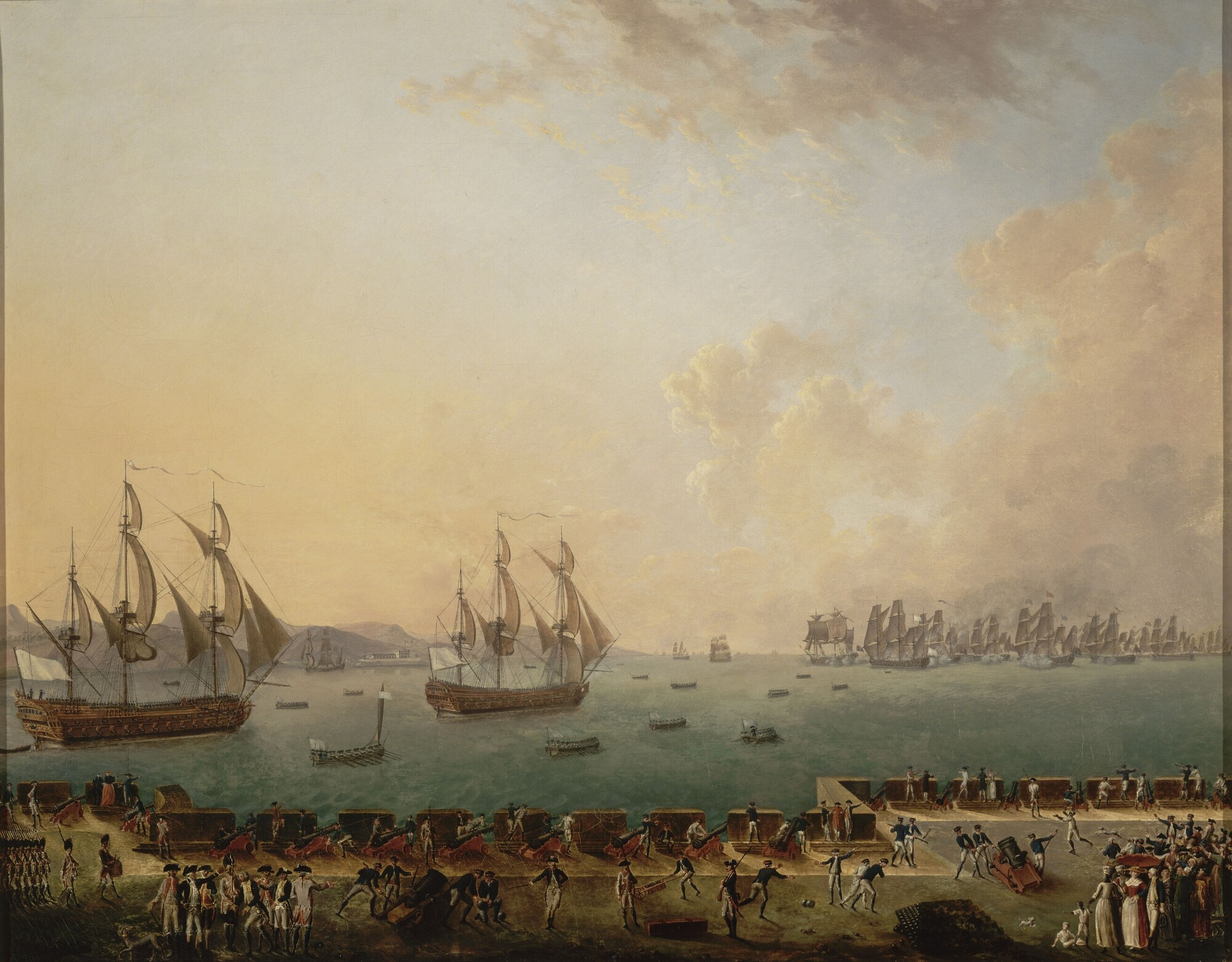
The 1779 "Combat de la Martinique", by Auguste-Louis de Rossel de Cercy.

On 18 December 1779, he attacked a British squadron under the command of Admiral Hyde Parker that was attempting to blockade a French convoy off Martinique; in the ensuing Battle of Martinique, La Motte-Picquet so impressed Parker that he sent him a letter of congratulation:

The conduct of your Excellency in the affair of the 18th of this month fully justifies the reputation which you enjoy among us, and I assure you that I could not witness without envy the skill you showed on that occasion. Our enmity is transient, depending upon our masters; but your merit has stamped upon my heart the greatest admiration for yourself.

On 2 May 1781, as commander of a nine-vessel squadron that included three frigates, Picquet de la Motte encountered a British convoy of 30 merchantmen en route from British-occupied Sint Eustatius 20 leagues off the Isles of Scilly. The convoy's escort, consisting of two ships of the line and three frigates under Commodore William Hotham, attempted to attack Picquet de la Motte's squadron. However, the French avoided the British warships and captured 22 merchantmen, which were taken to Brest and sold along with their cargos for 8 million livres. Soon afterwards he was promoted to Lieutenant General of the Naval Armies.

== Death and legacy ==
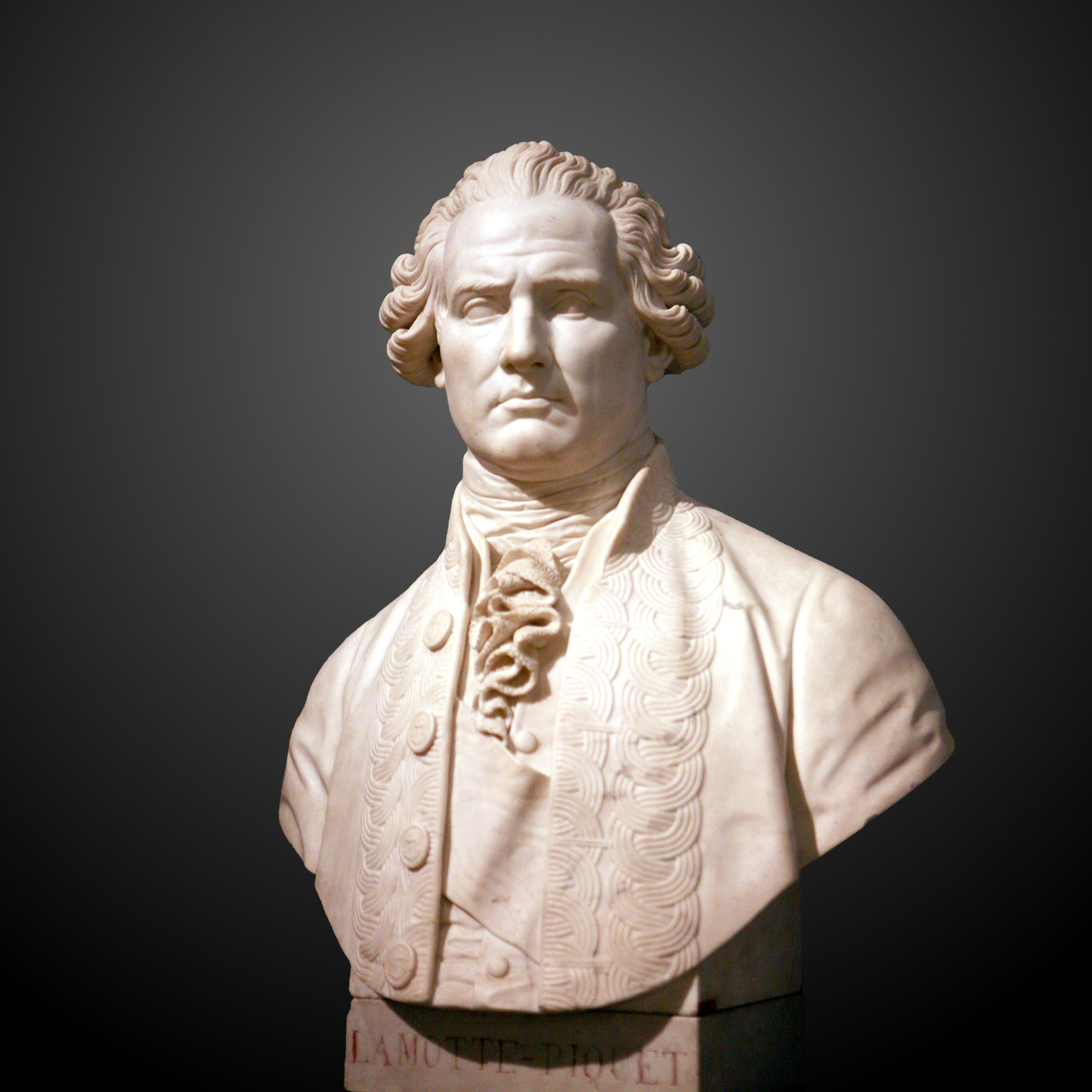
Bust of Picquet de la Motte by Isidore-Hippolyte Brion, on display at the Musée National de la Marine.

After fifty-two years of service and severe attacks of gout in his later years, La Motte-Piquet died on 11 June 1791 in Brest, aged 70. He was buried in the local graveyard. Five ships of the French Navy have been named La Motte-Picquet in his honour, the most recent being the F70-Type frigate Lamotte-Picquet, who was decommissioned in 2020. A street in the 7th arrondissement of Paris, l'Avenue de la Motte-Picquet, is named after him. The Paris metro station La Motte-Picquet – Grenelle is located on the avenue, on the border of the 7th and 15th arrondissements of Paris.

Ships of the French Navy named La Motte-Picquet
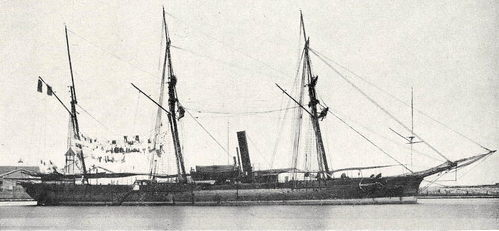
La Motte-Picquet (1859)

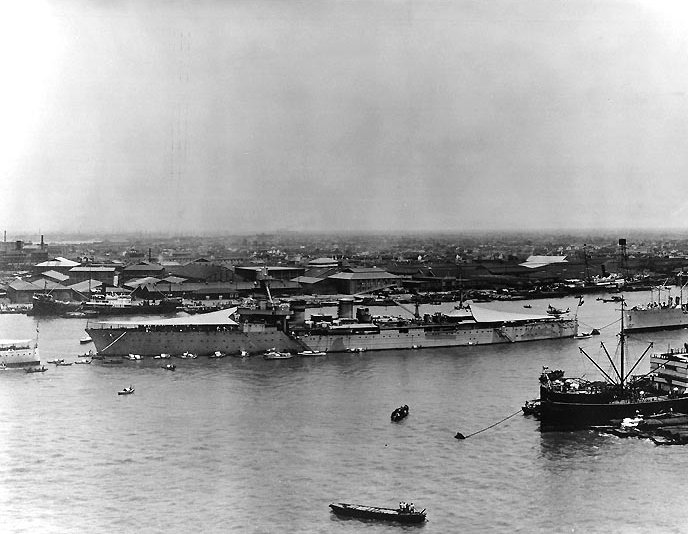
La Motte-Picquet (1923)

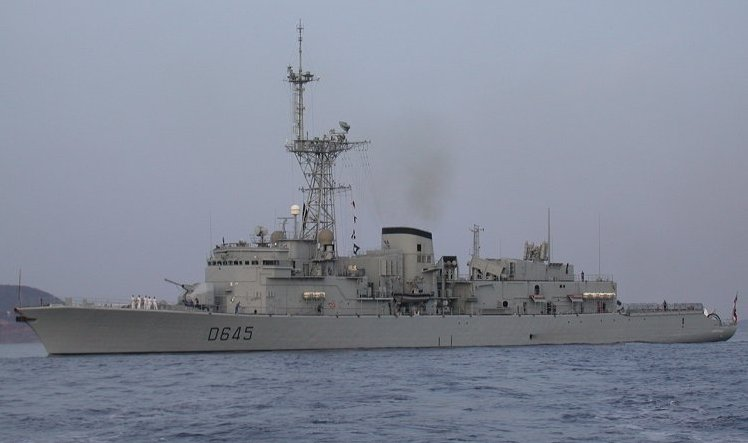
La Motte-Picquet (D645)

== See also ==
- French ship La Motte-Picquet
- Franco-American alliance

== Notes and references ==
=== Bibliography ===
- Louis Édouard Chevalier, Histoire de la marine française pendant la guerre de l'indépendance américaine, précédée d'une étude sur la marine militaire de la France et sur ses institutions depuis le commencement du XVIIe siècle jusqu'à l'année 1877, Paris, Hachette, 1877
- Amédée Gréhan, La France maritime, t. 3, Paris, chez Postel, 1837
- Vergé-Franceschi, Michel (2002). Dictionnaire d'histoire maritime. Paris: Robert Laffont. pp. 830–831. ISBN 2-221-09744-0.
- Jean Meyer et Martine Acerra, Histoire de la marine française : des origines à nos jours, Rennes, Ouest-France, 1994, 427 p. [détail de l’édition] (ISBN 2-7373-1129-2, notice BnF no FRBNF35734655)
- Étienne Taillemite et M. Dupont, Les Guerres navales françaises du Moyen Âge à la guerre du Golfe, collection Kronos, 1996.
- Taillemite, Étienne (2002). Dictionnaire des marins français (in French). Paris: Tallandier. ISBN 2-84734-008-4. OCLC 422254425.
- Pierre-Bruno-Jean de La Monneraye et Philippe Bonnichon, Souvenirs de 1760 à 1791, Librairie Droz, 1998, 505 p.
- Guy Le Moing, Les 600 plus grandes batailles navales de l'Histoire, Marines Éditions, mai 2011, 620 p. (ISBN 9782357430778)
- Levot, Prosper (1866). Les gloires maritimes de la France: notices biographiques sur les plus célèbres marins (in French). Bertrand. p. 280-283
- Louis-Mayeul Chaudon, Dictionnaire historique, critique et bibliographique, contenant les vies des hommes illustres, célèbres ou fameux, de tous les pays et de tous les siècles, suivi d'un dictionnaire abrégé des mythologies, et d'un tableau chronologique des événements les plus remarquables qui ont eu lieu depuis le commencement du monde jusqu'à nos jours, vol. 20, Paris, Ménard et Desenne, 1822
- Antoine-Vincent Arnault, Éphémérides universelles, ou, Tableau religieux, politique, littéraire, scientifique et anecdotique, présentant un extrait des annales de toutes les nations et de tous les siècles, 1834, p. 218
- Levot, Prosper (1852). Biographie bretonne: recueil de notices sur tous les Bretons qui se sont fait un nom (in French). Vol. 2. Caudran. p. 127
- Tugdual de Langlais, Jean Peltier Dudoyer, l'armateur préféré de Beaumarchais, de Nantes à l'Isle de France, Éd. Coiffard, 2015, 340 p. (ISBN 9782919339280). Ce livre a une reproduction de l'accord entre Jonathan Williams et le commandant du Lion, futur Dean. AD 44, C art 1030.
- Hennequin, Joseph François Gabriel (1835). Biographie maritime ou notices historiques sur la vie et les campagnes des marins célèbres français et étrangers (in French). Vol. 2. Paris: Regnault éditeur. p. 361 et suiv.
