= François Georges-Picot =

French diplomat who signed Sykes-Picot Agreement during World War I

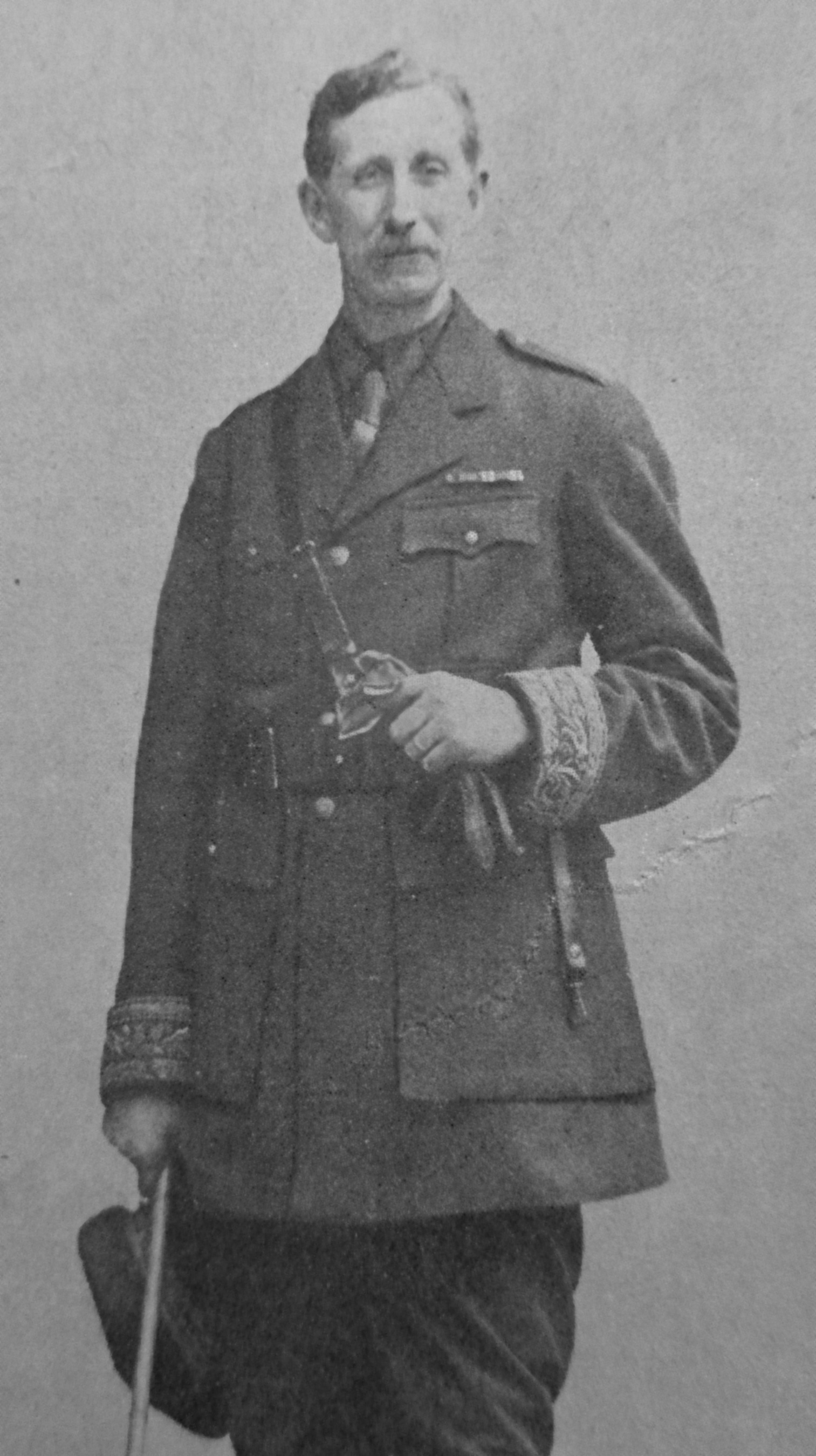
- François Georges-Picot, in L'Illustration, n° 3908, p. 82, 26 January 1918
- Born: François Marie Denis Georges-Picot; 21 December 1870; Paris, France
- Died: 20 June 1951 (aged 80); Paris, France
- Occupations: Lawyer, Diplomat
- Known for: Sykes–Picot Agreement
- Spouse: Marie Fouquet
- Children: 3
- Father: Georges Picot
- Relatives: Valéry Giscard d'Estaing (great-nephew); Olga Georges-Picot (great-niece)

François Marie Denis Georges-Picot (French pronunciation: [fʁɑ̃swa ʒɔʁʒ piko]; 21 December 1870 – 20 June 1951) was a French diplomat and lawyer who negotiated the Sykes–Picot Agreement with the British diplomat Sir Mark Sykes between November 1915 and March 1916 before its signing on 16 May 1916.

It was a secret deal which proposed that – when the partitioning of the Ottoman Empire began after a then theoretical victory of the Triple Entente – Britain and France, and later Russia and Italy, would divide up the Arab territories between them.

== Family ==
Georges-Picot was the son of historian Georges Picot and great-uncle of Valéry Giscard d'Estaing. He married Marie Fouquet in Paris on 11 May 1897. They had three children: Jean Georges-Picot (b. Paris, 26 February 1898), Élisabeth Georges-Picot (1901–1906) and Sibylle Georges-Picot. His great-niece Olga Georges-Picot appeared in the film The Day of the Jackal.

== Biography ==
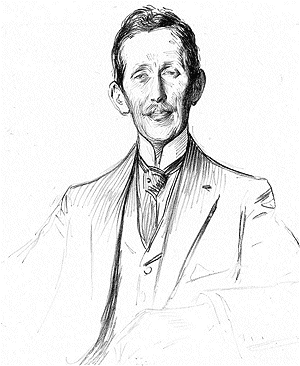
Drawing of Georges-Picot

Picot obtained a degree in Law and became a lawyer at the Court of Appeal of Paris in 1893. He became a diplomat in 1895 and was attached to the Policy Directorate in 1896. He then became Secretary to the Ambassador in Copenhagen, then went to Beijing before being appointed the Consul-General of France in Beirut shortly before the First World War.

At the outbreak of war, he went to Cairo where he maintained good relations with the Maronites of Lebanon. In the spring of 1915 he was recalled to Paris by the Ministry of Foreign Affairs and International Development. As a member of the French Colonial Party he was an advocate for those who supported a French Mandate for Syria and the Lebanon in the Sykes-Picot Agreement, desiring an "integral Syria" from Alexandretta in present-day Turkey to Sinai, and from Mosul to the Mediterranean coast.

He was appointed High Commissioner in Palestine and Syria between 1917 and 1919, Minister Plenipotentiary in 1919, High Commissioner of the Republic in Bulgaria in 1920, and ambassador to Argentina.

== Legacy ==
The majority of Arab countries regard Picot in a strongly negative light for his role in leading the 1916 execution of Arab intellectuals and his key role with Sir Mark Sykes in the Sykes-Picot Agreement.

King Faisal I regarded Georges-Picot as a war criminal, for Georges-Picot wrote up papers that exposed Arab nationalists. This resulted in the named people being put to death. Additionally, he indirectly abetted the Ottomans during the Armenian genocide when he withdrew the French Army, leaving the Armenians defenceless.
