= Picket =

Picket may refer to:

- Snow picket, a climbing tool
- Picket fence, a type of fence
- Screw picket, a tethering device
- Picket line, to tether horses
- "Picket line" is also used in picketing, a form of protest
  - See also: "Crossing the picket line"
- Picket (military), a soldier or small unit placed ahead of the main formation
  - Picket boat, a small military boat
  - Radar picket, a radar equipped vehicle on picket duty
- Picket (Polish: pikieta), a slang term to describe cruising for sex
- Picket (punishment), a 16th and 17th century military punishment
- Picket, a fairy chess piece
- The Flying Pickets, a British a cappella vocal group
- Picket (climbing)
- USS Picket, one of several ships of the United States Navy

== Places ==
- Picket Hill
- Picket Piece
- Picket Post, a road junction and service area in the New Forest National Park
- Picket Range, a small, extremely rugged subrange of the North Cascades
- Picket Seamount
- Picket Twenty

== See also ==
- Picket fence (disambiguation)
- Pickett (disambiguation)
- Picquet (disambiguation), an alternative spelling for picket but usually only in an historical context
- Piquet (disambiguation), like picquet another alternative spelling now usually reserved for the game
- Piquette (disambiguation)
