= Olga Georges-Picot =

French actress (1940–1997)

- Born: 6 January 1940; Shanghai, China
- Died: 19 June 1997 (aged 57); Paris, France
- Occupation: actress
- Years active: 1962–1986
- Relatives: François Georges-Picot (great-uncle)

Olga Georges-Picot (French: [ɔlga ʒɔʁʒ piko]; 6 January 1940 – 19 June 1997) was a French actress. She was a great-niece of diplomat François Georges-Picot.

== Early life ==
Born in Shanghai, in Japanese-occupied China, she was the daughter of Guillaume Georges-Picot, the French Ambassador to China, and a Russian mother, Anastasia Mironovich. She attended the International School in Geneva in the early fifties with her sister. She also attended the Lycée français de New York (Class of 1958). She studied acting at the Actors Studio in Paris.

== Career ==
Her acting career included roles in French and English films, and on television. She was featured in Playboy Magazine's "Sex in Cinema" column, and also on the front cover of the periodical Adam.

She appeared in three mainstream films: Denise, the OAS mole, in The Day of the Jackal (1973); Countess Alexandrovna in Woody Allen's Love and Death (1975); and Julie Anderson in Basil Dearden's The Man Who Haunted Himself (1970). Her breakthrough role in the movies was as Catrine in the Alain Resnais’s film Je t'aime, je t'aime (1968). Earlier that year, she had appeared in the French television movie Thibaud the Crusader (1968).

== Death ==
On Thursday 19 June 1997, she jumped to her death from the 5th floor of an apartment building in Paris, France.

== Filmography ==
Year	Title	Role	Notes
1962	Tales of Paris	La secrétaire	(segment "Ella")
1967	Two for the Road	Joanna's Touring Friend	Uncredited
1968	Je t'aime, je t'aime	Catrine	
1968	Farewell, Friend	Isabelle Moreau	
1968	Sleep Is Lovely	Elsa	
1968	Summit	Agathe	
1969	Catherine, il suffit d'un amour	Catherine	
1970	The Man Who Haunted Himself	Julie Anderson	
1970	Connecting Rooms	Claudia	
1971	La cavale	Nadine	
1972	The Man Who Quit Smoking	Gunhild	
1973	La révélation	Clarie	
1973	Un Homme libre	Nicole Lefèvre	
1973	The Day of the Jackal	Denise	
1973	Le feu aux lèvres	Christine Benoît	
1973	Les Confidences érotiques d'un lit trop accueillant	Dominique	
1973	Féminin-féminin	Marie-Hélène	
1974	Successive slidings of pleasure	Nora / lawyer	
1974	Persecution	Monique Kalfon	aka Sheba, The Graveyard, The Terror of Sheba
1974	Härte 10	Nadine Mercier	TV mini-series, 6 episodes
1975	Children of Rage	Leylah Saleh	
1975	Love and Death	Countess Alexandrovna	
1977	Goodbye Emmanuelle	Florence	
1978	Brigade mondaine		
1984	Rebelote	Suzanne Chauveau, la mère	
