= Piquet (disambiguation) =

Piquet is a card game.

Piquet may also refer to:

== People ==
- Georges Jules Piquet (fl. 1880s), French Governor General for Inde française in the Second French Colonial Empire under Third Republic
- Jean-Baptiste Marie de Piquet, Marquess of Méjanes (1729-1786) French aristocrat
- Laurence Piquet (fl. 1980s-present), French female television personality
- Nelson Piquet (born 1952), Brazilian Formula One driver
- Nelson Piquet Jr. (born 1985), Brazilian race car driver
- Pedro Piquet (born 1998), Brazilian race car driver
- René-Émile Piquet (born 1932), French politician

== Sports ==
- Piquet Racing (fl. 1992), a British Formula 3000 racing team set up by Nelson Piquet and Nigel Stepney
- Piquet GP (2007-2009; formerly Minardi Piquet Sports) motorsports team, created from the merger of Piquet Sports (founded 2000) and GP Racing (founded 1997)
- Piquet Sports (2000-2007) motorsports team founded by Nelson Piquet Sr., that merged in 2007 into Piquet GP

== Other uses ==
- Alternative obsolete spelling for picket or picquet
- Le Plessis-Piquet aka Piquet Castle, Le Plessis-Robinson, Ile-de-France, France; a medieval castle

== See also ==
- Pickett (disambiguation)
- Piquette (disambiguation)
