= French frigate Primauguet =

French Marine Nationale F70 type anti-submarine frigate

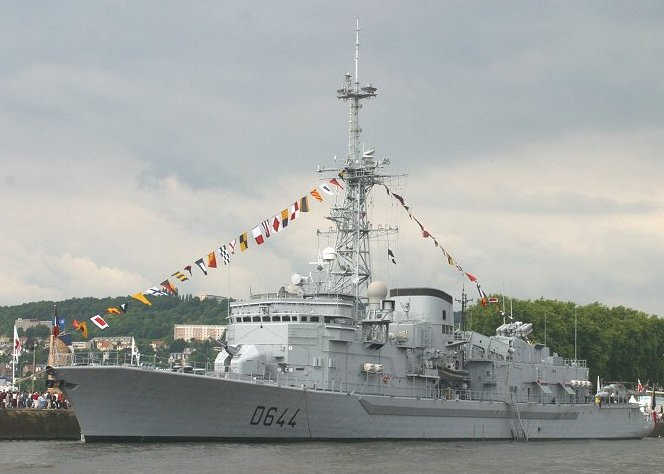

History

France
- Name: Primauguet
- Laid down: 17 November 1981
- Launched: 17 March 1984
- Commissioned: 5 November 1986
- Out of service: April 2019
- Status: Decommissioned

General characteristics (as completed)
- Class & type: Georges Leygues-class frigate
- Displacement: 3,550 t (3,494 long tons); 4,580 t (4,508 long tons) full load
- Length: 139 m (456 ft)
- Beam: 14 m (45 ft 11 in)
- Draught: 5.7 m (18 ft 8 in)
- Propulsion: 2 shafts; CODOG; 2 × gas turbines, 23,100 shp (23,420 PS; 17,226 kW) each; 2 × diesel engines, 6,400 PS (6,312 bhp; 4,707 kW) each
- Speed: 30 knots (56 km/h; 35 mph)
- Range: 9,500 nmi (17,600 km; 10,900 mi) at 17 knots (31 km/h; 20 mph)
- Sensors & processing systems: DRBV 51C search radar; DRBV 26 early-warning radar; DRBC 32E fire-control radar; DUBV 23B hull-mounted sonar; DUBV 43B variable depth sonar
- Electronic warfare & decoys: 2 × Syllex chaff launchers
- Armament: 4 x single Exocet anti-ship missiles; 2 × fixed torpedo tubes; 1 × single 100 mm (3.9 in) DP gun; 2 × single 20 mm (0.8 in) AA guns; 1 × octuple Crotale anti-air missile launcher
- Aircraft carried: 2 × Westland Lynx helicopters
- Aviation facilities: Double hangar

Primauguet was one of seven F70 type guided-missile frigates built for the French Marine Nationale during the 1980s. Completed in 1986, she served in the Cold War.

== Design and description ==
The Georges Leygues-class ships were designed as anti-submarine (ASW) escorts for the fleet. They had an overall length of 139 metres (456 ft), a beam of 14 m (45 ft 11 in) and a draught of 5.7 m (18 ft 8 in). The ships had a standard displacement of 3,830 tonnes (3,770 long tons) and 4,580 tonnes (4,510 long tons) at full load. Based on experience with the earlier ships in the class, Primaguet had her bridge (nautical) raised one level and 210 t (210 long tons) of ballast was added to improve her stability. The Georges Leyguess' propulsion machinery used a CODOG configuration with one SEMT-Pielstick 16PA6-V280 diesel engine and a Rolls-Royce Olympus TM3B gas turbine were coupled to each of the two propeller shafts. The diesels were used for speeds under 21 knots (39 km/h; 24 mph) and the gas turbines for sprints up to 30 knots (56 km/h; 35 mph). The diesels were rated at a total of 12,800 metric horsepower (12,600 bhp; 9,400 kW) and the turbines at a total of 46,200 shp (46,800 PS; 34,500 kW). The combination give the ships a range of 9,500 nautical miles (17,600 km; 10,900 mi) at 17 knots (31 km/h; 20 mph). The frigates had a complement of 216 sailors.

The primary anti-ship weapon of the Georges Leyguess consisted of four single box launchers for MM40 Exocet anti-ship missiles, located aft of the funnel with two launchers on each broadside. The frigates were designed with a single 100-millimetre (3.9 in) Modèle 1968 dual-purpose gun in a single-gun turret forward of the superstructure. They were also equipped with two 20 mm (0.8 in) guns. The ships were fitted with a octuple Crotale anti-aircraft missile launcher with 26 reloads located on the aft superstructure. The anti-submarine (ASW) weapons of the Georges Leygues-class ships consisted of two torpedo launchers, one on each side of the ship. Each ship carried ten torpedoes. The ships were designed to carry helicopters, a pair of Westland Lynx ASW helicopters in a double hangar at the stern.

They were completed with a DRBV 51C search radar, a DRBC 32E fire-control radar and a DRBV 26 early-warning radar. For anti-submarine warfare, they were equipped with a DUBV 23B hull-mounted sonar and DUBV 43B towed variable depth sonar. For electronic defence, the vessels mounted two Syllex chaff launchers. The SENIT 4 tactical data system coordinated sensor data.
