= Georges Leygues-class frigate =

Class of destroyers in the French Navy

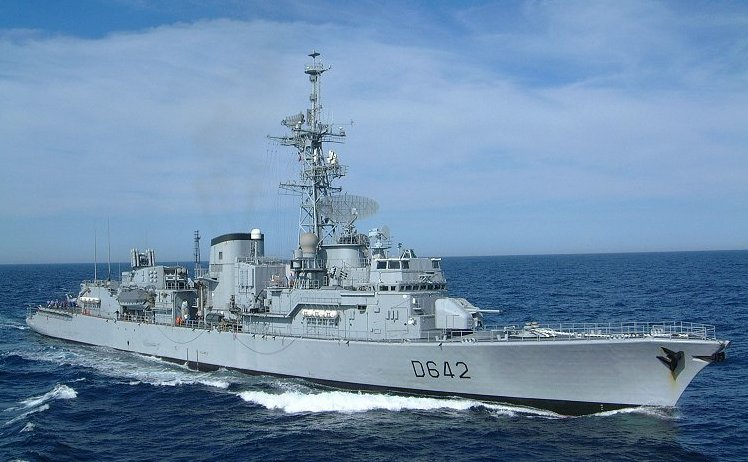
- Montcalm

Class overview
- Name: Georges Leygues class
- Builders: Arsenal de Brest
- Operators: French Navy
- Preceded by: Tourville class
- Succeeded by: Aquitaine class (anti-submarine variant)
- Built: 1974–1988
- In commission: 1979 – 2022
- Completed: 7
- Retired: 7

General characteristics (as built)
- Type: Frigate
- Displacement: 3,550 t (3,494 long tons); 4,500–4,580 t (4,429–4,508 long tons) full load
- Length: 139 m (456 ft)
- Beam: 14 m (45 ft 11 in)
- Draught: 5.7 m (18 ft 8 in)
- Propulsion: 2 shafts; CODOG; 2 × gas turbines, 23,100 shp (23,420 PS; 17,226 kW) each; 2 × diesel engines, 6,400 PS (6,312 bhp; 4,707 kW) each
- Speed: 30 knots (56 km/h; 35 mph)
- Range: 9,500 nmi (17,600 km; 10,900 mi) at 17 knots (31 km/h; 20 mph)
- Sensors & processing systems: DRBV 51C search radar; DRBV 26 early-warning radar; DRBC 32E fire-control radar; DUBV 23B hull-mounted sonar; DUBV 43B variable depth sonar
- Electronic warfare & decoys: 2 × Syllex chaff launchers
- Armament: 4 x single MM38 Exocet anti-ship missiles; 2 × fixed torpedo tubes; 1 × single 100 mm (3.9 in) DP gun; 2 × single 20 mm (0.8 in) AA guns; 1 × octuple Crotale anti-air missile launcher
- Aircraft carried: 2 × Westland Lynx helicopters
- Aviation facilities: Double hangar

The Georges Leygues class (Type C70 AS or Type F70 AS) consisted of seven guided-missile destroyers built for the French Navy during the Cold War. They were multi-role ships due to their Exocet and Crotale missile armament, making them especially suitable for the defence of strategic positions, show of force operations, or as high seas escorts. The design was initially officially known as a "corvette" with the designation C70, but were internationally labelled an "anti-submarine destroyer" (hence the "D" in the hull numbers). Subsequently, the French referred to the ships as "frigates" with the designation F70.

== Design and description ==
The Georges Leygues-class ships were designed as anti-submarine (ASW) escorts for the fleet. They had an overall length of 139 metres (456 ft), a beam of 14 m (45 ft 11 in) and a draught of 5.7 m (18 ft 8 in). The ships had a standard displacement of 3,830 tonnes (3,770 long tons) and 4,500–4,580 tonnes (4,430–4,510 long tons) at full load. The Georges Leyguess' propulsion machinery used a CODOG configuration with one SEMT-Pielstick 16PA6-V280 diesel engine and a Rolls-Royce Olympus TM3B gas turbine were coupled to each of the two propeller shafts. The diesels were used for speeds under 21 knots (39 km/h; 24 mph) and the gas turbines for sprints up to 30 knots (56 km/h; 35 mph). The diesels were rated at a total of 12,800 metric horsepower (12,600 bhp; 9,400 kW) and the turbines at a total of 46,200 shp (46,800 PS; 34,500 kW). The combination give the ships a range of 9,500 nautical miles (17,600 km; 10,900 mi) at 17 knots (31 km/h; 20 mph). The frigates had a complement of 216 sailors.

The primary anti-ship weapon of the Georges Leyguess consisted of four single box launchers for MM38 Exocet anti-ship missiles, located aft of the funnel with two launchers on each broadside. The frigates were designed with a single 100-millimetre (3.9 in) Modèle 1968 dual-purpose gun in a single-gun turret forward of the superstructure. They were also equipped with two 20 mm (0.8 in) guns. The ships were fitted with a octuple Crotale anti-aircraft missile launcher with 26 reloads located on the aft superstructure. The anti-submarine (ASW) weapons of the Georges Leygues-class ships consisted of two torpedo launchers, one on each side of the ship. Each ship carried ten torpedoes. The ships were designed to carry helicopters, a pair of Westland Lynx ASW helicopters in a double hangar at the stern.

They were completed with a DRBV 51C search radar, a DRBC 32E fire-control radar and a DRBV 26 early-warning radar. For anti-submarine warfare, they were equipped with a DUBV 23B hull-mounted sonar and DUBV 43B towed variable depth sonar. For electronic defence, the vessels mounted two Syllex chaff launchers. The SENIT 4 tactical data system coordinated sensor data.

The superstructures were built to optimise resistance to the blast from nuclear explosions. The last three ships of the class had their bridges raised one deck to overcome problems experienced by the first four in bad weather, as well as being equipped with DSBV 61 passive linear towed array sonar and several other upgraded systems.

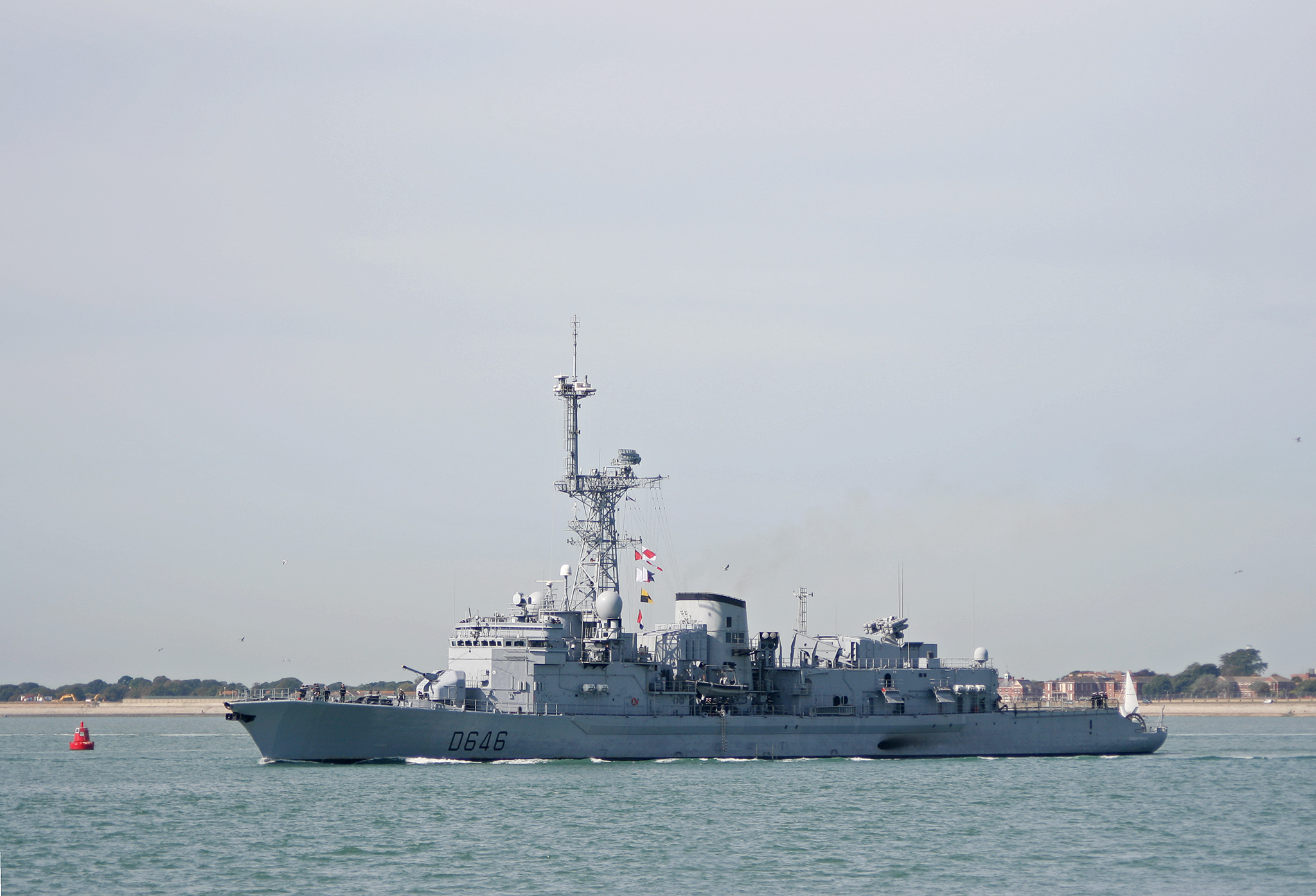
Latouche-Tréville departing Portsmouth Naval Base, UK, 21 September 2009.

== Ships in class ==
Georges Leygues-class frigates
Name	Pennant number	Builder	Laid down	Launched	Commissioned	Decommissioned
Georges Leygues	D 640	Arsenal de Brest	16 September 1974	17 December 1976	10 December 1979	21 March 2014
Dupleix	D 641	Arsenal de Brest	17 October 1975	2 December 1978	13 June 1981	July 2015
Montcalm	D 642	Arsenal de Brest	5 December 1975	31 May 1980	28 May 1982	3 July 2017
Jean de Vienne	D 643	Arsenal de Brest	26 October 1979	17 November 1981	25 May 1984	9 January 2019
Primauguet	D 644	Arsenal de Brest	17 November 1981	17 March 1984	5 November 1986	1 April 2019
La Motte-Picquet	D 645	Arsenal de Brest	12 February 1982	6 February 1985	18 February 1988	13 October 2020
Latouche-Tréville	D 646	Arsenal de Brest	15 February 1984	19 March 1988	16 July 1990	1 July 2022

== See also ==
Equivalent frigates of the same era

- Bremen class
- Maestrale class
- Kortenaer class
- Niterói class
- Krivak class
- Knox class

== Bibliography ==
- Jordan, John (1995). "France". In Chumbley, Stephen (ed.). Conway's All The World's Fighting Ships 1947–1995. Annapolis, Maryland: Naval Institute Press. pp. 95–131. ISBN 1-55750-132-7.
- Moore, John, ed. (1981). Jane's Fighting Ships 1981–82. London: Jane's Publishing. ISBN 0-531-03977-3.
- Saunders, Stephen, ed. (2004). Jane's Fighting Ships 2004–2005. Coulsdon, UK: Jane's Information Group. ISBN 0-7106-2623-1.
