= Rolls-Royce Olympus variants =

Range of British turbojet aircraft engines

Olympus variants
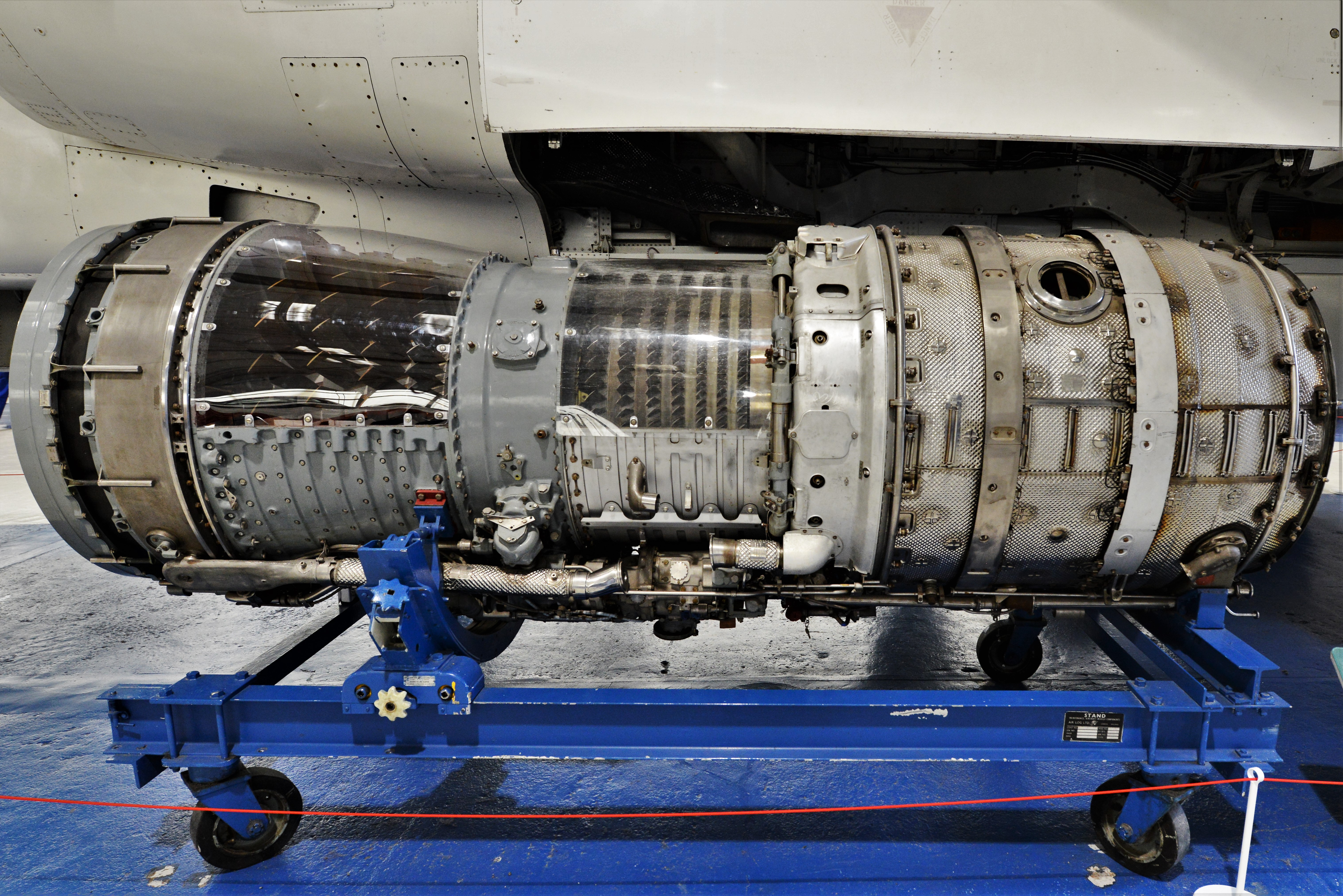
- Olympus Mk.320 on display at the Royal Air Force Museum Cosford
- Type: Turbojet
- National origin: United Kingdom
- Manufacturer: Bristol Aero Engines; Bristol Siddeley Engines Limited; Rolls-Royce Bristol Engine Division
- First run: 1950
- Major applications: Avro Vulcan; BAC TSR-2

The Rolls-Royce Olympus turbojet engine was developed extensively throughout its production run, the many variants can be described as belonging to four main groups.

Initial non-afterburning variants were designed and produced by Bristol Aero Engines and Bristol Siddeley (BSEL) and powered the Avro Vulcan. These engines were further developed by Rolls-Royce Limited.

The first afterburning variant, the Bristol Siddeley Olympus Mk 320, powered the cancelled BAC TSR-2 strike aircraft. A further afterburning variant was the Rolls-Royce/Snecma Olympus 593, jointly developed to power Concorde in the 1960s.

The American Curtiss-Wright company tested a license-developed version known as the J67 and a turboprop designated TJ-38 Zephyr. Neither design was produced.

Further derivatives of the Olympus were produced for ship propulsion and land-based power generation.

== Bristol Aero Engines, Bristol Siddeley and Rolls-Royce variants ==
Thrust given in foot-pounds (lbf) and kilonewtons (kN).

=== Company designations ===
BOl.1/2A

BOl.1/2B

BOl.1/2C

BOl.2

BOl.3
Of all the early initial developments, BOl.2 to BOl.5 (the BOl.5 was never built), perhaps the most significant was the BOl.3. Even before the Vulcan first flew, the Olympus 3 was being suggested as the definitive powerplant for the aircraft. In the event, the 'original' Olympus was continuously developed for the Vulcan B1. The BOl.3 was described in 1957 as "a high-ended product intermediate between the Olympus 100 and 200 series."

BOl.4

BOl.5
not built

BOl.6
(Mk.200) The initial design of the second-generation 'Olympus 6' began in 1952. This was a major redesign with five LP and seven HP compressor stages and a cannular combustor with eight interconnected flame tubes. In spite of a much greater mass flow, the size and weight of the BOl.6 was little different from earlier models. 16,000 lbf (71 kN) thrust. Used for first B2 Vulcan (XH533) only.

Rival manufacturers Rolls-Royce lobbied very hard to have its Conway engine installed in the Vulcan B2 to achieve commonality with the Victor B2. As a consequence, Bristol undertook to complete development using company funds and peg the price to that of its fully government-funded rival.

BOl.7
(Mk.201): Proposed for the thin-wing Javelin interceptor ~17,000 lbf (76 kN) dry thrust.

BOl.7SR
Version with Simplified Reheat, but greater dry thrust.

BOl.11
(Mk.102)

BOl.12
(Mk.104)

BOl.21
(Mk.301): Ultimate development for the thin-wing Javelin, with ~28,000 lbf (120 kN) in full reheat.

BOl.21R
not built, proposed for R.A.E. Missile (A) designed to meet O.R. 1149 issued May 1956.

BOl.22R
(Mk.320)

BOl.23
not built, proposed with a 301 compressor, 22R turbine and reheat to give 25,000 lbf (110 kN) at take-off (reheat).

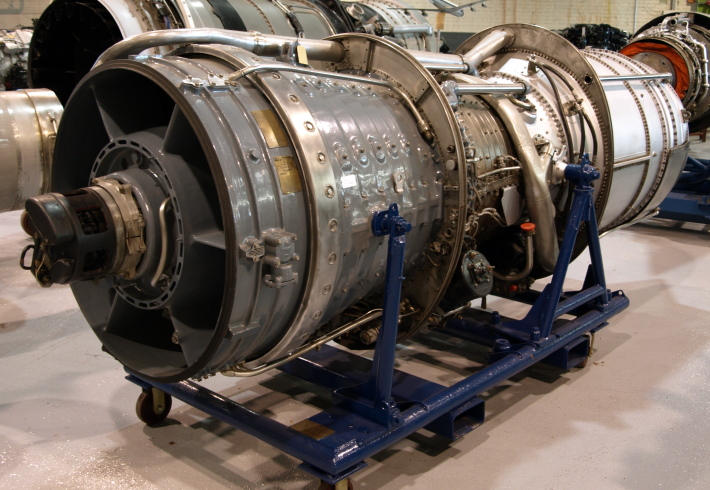
Preserved Rolls-Royce Olympus Mk.101 on display at the Rolls-Royce Heritage Trust, Derby

=== Service designations ===
Olympus Mk 97
This early engine tested an early annular combustion chamber. It was test flown on Bristol's Avro Ashton test bed WB493.

Olympus Mk 100
(BOl.1/2B) Similar to Olympus Mk 99 rated at 9,250 lbf (41.1 kN) thrust for second Vulcan prototype VX777. First flew September 1953. (Note: VX777 was retrofitted with Mk 101, Mk 102 and Mk 104 engines.)

Olympus Mk 101
(BOl.1/2C) Larger turbine, 11,000 lbf (49 kN) thrust for initial production Vulcan B1 aircraft. First flew (XA889) February 1955.

Olympus Mk 102
(BOl.11) Additional zero stage on LP compressor, 12,000 lbf (53 kN) thrust for later production Vulcan B1 aircraft.

Olympus Mk 104
(BOl.12) Designation for Olympus Mk 102 modified on overhaul with new turbine and burners, 13,000 lbf (58 kN) thrust initially, 13,500 lbf (60 kN) thrust on uprating, standard on Vulcan B1A.
'Olympus 106'
Used to describe the development engine for the Olympus 200 (BOl.6). Possibly a corruption of BOl.6 (Olympus 6).

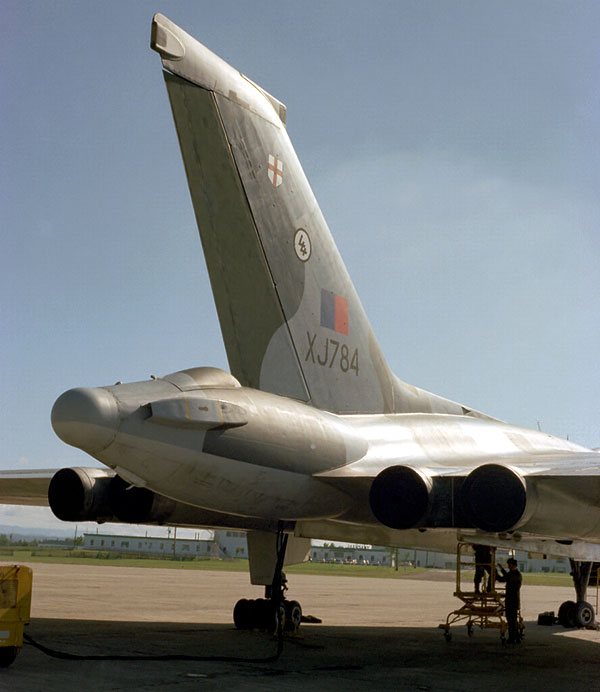
Avro Vulcan XJ784 at CFB Bagotville in 1978. It is powered by four Olympus Mk 301 engines, identified by their shorter and wider jet pipe nozzles.

Olympus Mk 201
(BOl.7) Uprated Olympus Mk 200. 17,000 lbf (76 kN) thrust. Initial Vulcan B2 aircraft.

Olympus Mk 202
Disputed. Either Olympus Mk 201 modified with rapid air starter, or Olympus Mk 201 with redesigned oil separator breathing system. This was the definitive '200 series' engine fitted to Vulcans not fitted with the Mk 301. The restored Vulcan XH558 is fitted with Olympus Mk 202 engines.

'Olympus Mk 203'
Very occasional reference to this elusive mark of engine can be found in some official Air Publications relating to the Vulcan B2. It is also noted in a manufacturer's archived document dated circa 1960.

Olympus Mk 301
(BOl.21) Additional zero stage on LP compressor. 21,000 lbf (93 kN) thrust. Later Vulcan B2 aircraft plus nine earlier aircraft (Note: XH557 (flight test), XJ784 (certification), XL384-390 (retrofit programme)) retrofitted. Later derated to 18,000 lbf (80 kN) thrust. Restored to original rating for Operation Black Buck.

Olympus 510 series
With a thrust in the region of 15,000 to 19,000 lbf (67 to 85 kN), the 510 series were civilianised versions of the BOl.6. A team was sent to Boeing at Seattle to promote the engine in 1956 but without success.

Olympus 551
The Olympus 551 'Zephyr' was a derated and lightened version of the BOl.6 and rated at 13,500 lbf (60 kN) thrust. The engine was the subject of a licence agreement between Bristol Aero Engines and the Curtiss-Wright Corporation – the engine being marketed in the US as the Curtiss-Wright TJ-38 Zephyr. There were hopes to fit the Olympus 551 to the Avro Type 740 and Bristol Type 200 trijet airliners which did not progress beyond the project stage. Curtiss-Wright also failed to market the engine.

== Bristol Olympus (BOl) 22R (Mk. 320) ==
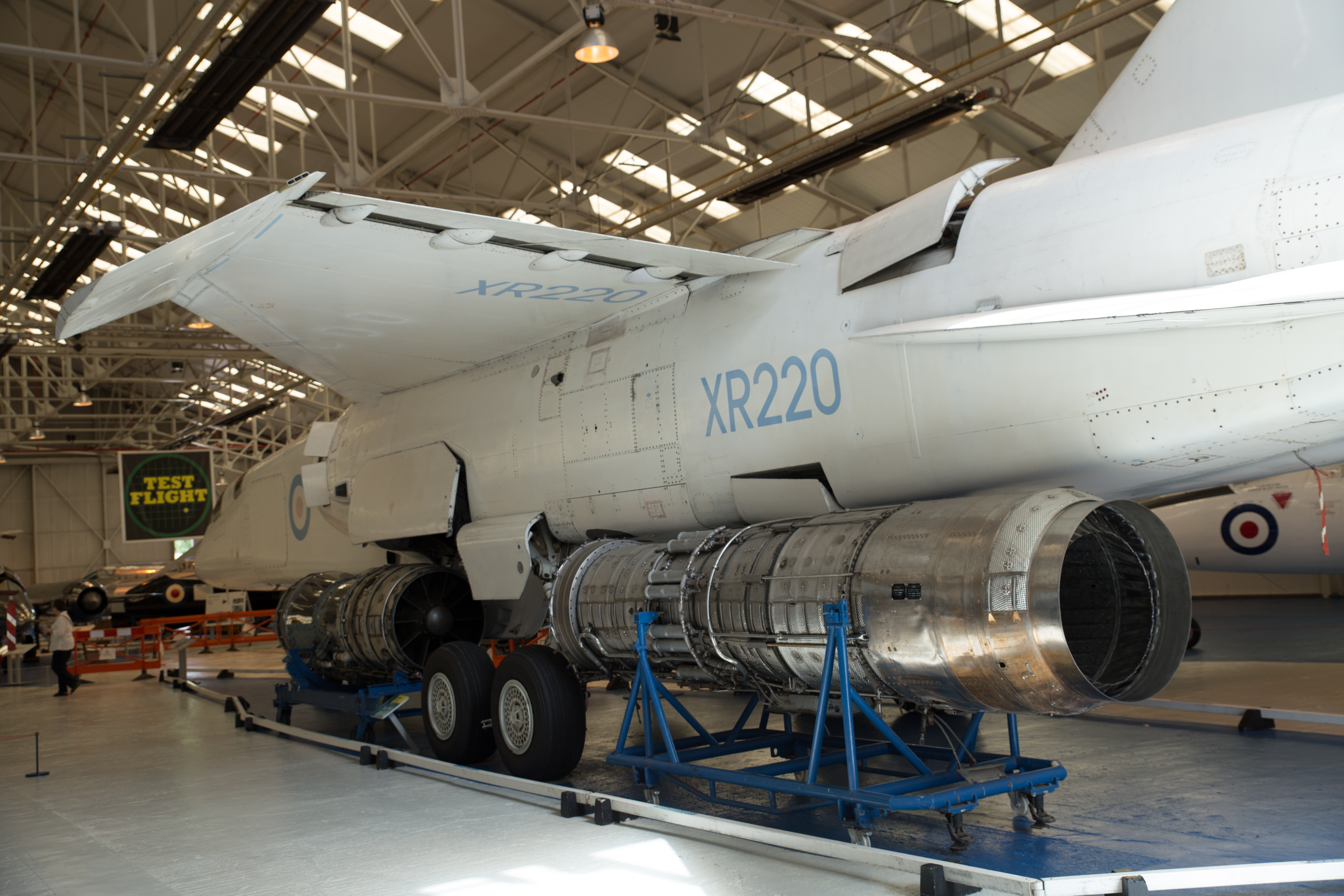
TSR-2 with Olympus Mk.320 engines on display at the Royal Air Force Museum Cosford

The performance specification for the BAC TSR-2 was issued in 1962. It was to be powered by two BSEL Olympus Mk 320 (BOl.22R) engines each rated at 19,610 lbf (87.2 kN) dry and 30,610 lbf (136.2 kN) with reheat at take-off. The engine, which was re-stressed for supersonic flight at sea level, and over Mach 2.0 at altitude, and featured much use of high-temperature alloys such as titanium and Nimonic, was a cutting edge derivative of the Olympus Mk 301 with a Solar-type afterburner.

The engine first ran in March 1961, soon achieving 33,000 lbf (150 kN), and was test flown in February 1962 in an underslung nacelle in the belly of Vulcan B1 XA894 and was demonstrated at the Farnborough Air Show in September. In December 1962 during a full power ground run at Filton, the LP shaft failed. The liberated turbine disc ruptured fuel tanks and the subsequent fire completely destroyed the Vulcan.

On its first flight in September 1964 the engines of the TSR-2 were scarcely flightworthy being derated and cleared for one flight. Nevertheless, the risk was deemed acceptable in the political climate of the time. With new engines, the TSR-2 XR219 flew another 23 times before the project was cancelled in 1965. By this time the engine had accumulated 6,000 hours of testing, including 800 hours of operation in reheat, with an additional 61 flight hours in the Vulcan test bed, and a further additional 26 flight hours in the TSR-2 prototype XR219.

== Rolls-Royce/Snecma Olympus 593 ==
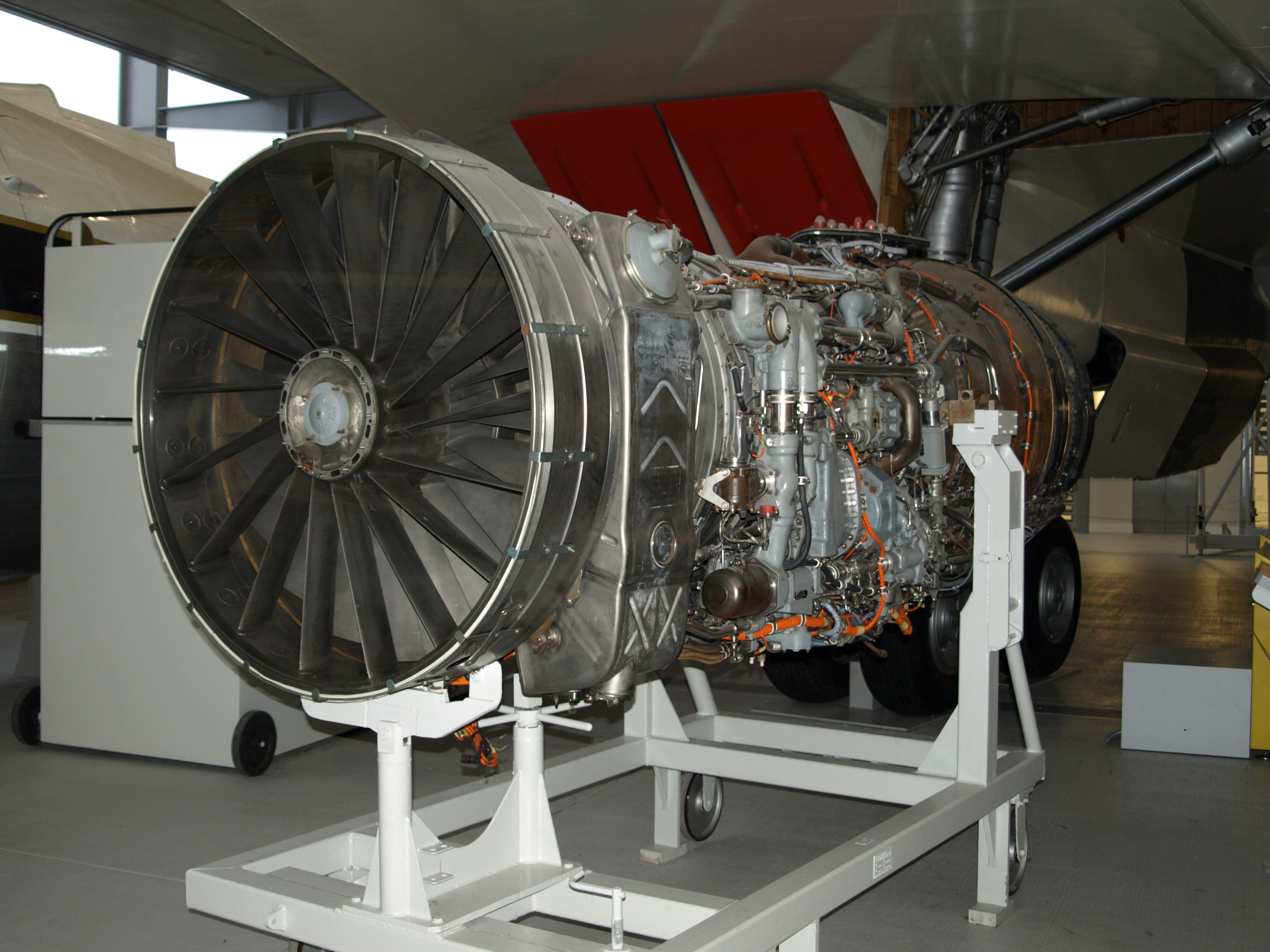
Olympus 593 on display at the Imperial War Museum Duxford

The Rolls-Royce/Snecma Olympus 593 was a reheated version of the Olympus which powered the supersonic airliner Concorde. The Olympus 593 project was started in 1964, using the TSR2's Olympus Mk 320 as a basis for development. BSEL and Snecma Moteurs of France were to share the project. Acquiring BSEL in 1966, Rolls-Royce continued as the British partner.

593D
Formerly Olympus 593. 28,100 lbf (125 kN) thrust. (the 'D' in the engine designation equalling 'derivation' – for smaller, short-range version of Concorde that was later cancelled)
593B
Flight test and prototype aircraft. 34,370 lbf (152.9 kN) thrust with reheat. (the 'B' in the engine designation equalling 'big' – for long-range Concorde that subsequently entered service)
593-602
Production. Annular combustion chamber to reduce smoke
593-610
Last production. 38,075 lbf (169.37 kN) thrust with reheat.
593-621
Planned for introduction on 41st aircraft. 38,275 lbf (170.26 kN) thrust with reheat.
593-631
Planned. Additional zero-stage compressor, redesigned HP spool. 41,360 lbf (184.0 kN) thrust with reheat.
593-series
By the time of Concorde's withdrawal from service in 2003, the Olympus 593 had accumulated 930,000 flight hours, with more than 500,000 of these hours being supersonic.

== Curtiss-Wright developments ==
Curtiss-Wright TJ-32
Examples of the BOl.1/2A were delivered to Curtiss-Wright in 1950. The engine was Americanised during 1951 and flew under a Boeing B-29 testbed as the TJ-32.
Curtiss-Wright J67
To meet a USAF demand for an engine in the 15,000 lbf (67 kN) thrust class, the engine was the subject of a development contract, redesigned and designated J67. Development was protracted and in 1955, the USAF announced that there would be no production contract for the present J67. Several aircraft had been intended to receive the J67 including the Convair F-102 Delta Dagger.
Curtiss-Wright T47
The T47 was an attempt to produce a turboprop based upon the J67. The T47 weighed 5,900 lb (2,700 kg) and produced 16,000 equivalent shp (12,000 kW) after accounting for residual jet thrust of 4,700 lbf (2,100 kgf; 21 kN).
TJ-38 Zephyr
See Olympus 551.

== Other developments ==
Civilianised Olympus
Plans to civilianise the Olympus go back as far as 1953 with the unveiling of the Avro Atlantic airliner based upon the Vulcan. However, most of the civilian derivatives, except for supersonic airliners, were developed from the BOl.6.

Thin-wing Javelin
One project that got beyond the drawing board was a supersonic development of the Gloster Javelin, the P370, powered by two BOl.6, 7, or 7SR engines. The design evolved into the P376 with two BOl.21R engines rated at 28,500 lbf (127 kN) with reheat. Eighteen aircraft were ordered in 1955. The project was abandoned the following year.

Afterburning Olympus
As early as 1952, Bristol had considered the use of reheat, or afterburning, to augment the thrust of the Olympus. Initially, a system called Bristol Simplifed Reheat was devised which was tested on a Rolls-Royce Derwent V mounted in an Avro Lincoln. Later it was tested on an Orenda engine in Canada and on an Olympus Mk 100 in the Avro Ashton test bed.

Fully variable reheat became possible after an agreement with the Solar Aircraft Company of San Diego which manufactured bench units for the Olympus Mks 101 and 102. An afterburning Olympus was just one proposal for the Vulcan Phase 6, a 350,000 lb (160 t) aircraft with a 13/14-hour endurance.

Olympus driving aft fan
BS.81 rated at 28,000 lbf (120 kN). As an alternative to afterburning a fan mounted at the trailing edge of the wing was proposed for the Vulcan Phase 6. The fan was driven by a turbine in the engine exhaust at the end of the jetpipe.

Vectored thrust Olympus
A vertical take-off Vulcan was proposed in 1960. It used 4 vectored-thrust Olympus as well as 10 lift engines.

== Derivatives ==
=== Marine ===
- Rolls-Royce Marine Olympus

=== Industrial power generation ===
The Olympus entered service as a peak demand industrial power generator in 1962 when the Central Electricity Generating Board (CEGB) commissioned a single prototype installation at its Hams Hall power station. Power was provided by an Olympus 201 exhausting through a two-stage turbine powering a Brush synchronous alternator providing 20 MW at 3000 rpm. By 1972, the CEGB had installed 42 Olympus generating sets. Olympus engines are also used to provide backup power in case of a loss of grid electrical power at some of Britain's nuclear power stations.

Many sets were exported and many found use on offshore platforms. By 1990, over 320 sets had been sold to 21 countries, many of which remain in service.

== Specifications (Olympus 301) ==
Data from flightglobal

==== General characteristics ====
- Type: axial flow two-spool turbojet
- Length: 155.33 in (12.9 ft; 3.9 m)
- Diameter: 44.5 in (3.7 ft; 1.1 m)
- Dry weight: 4,070 lb (1,850 kg)

==== Components ====
- Compressor: axial 6 LP stages, 7 HP stages
- Combustors: cannular 10 flame tubes

==== Performance ====
- Maximum thrust: 21,000 lbf (93 kN)
- Specific fuel consumption: 0.809 lb/(lbf⋅h) (22.9 g/(kN⋅s))
- Thrust-to-weight ratio: 4.66

== See also ==
Related development

- Bristol Siddeley BS100 (Olympus core)
- Rolls-Royce Marine Olympus
- Rolls-Royce/Snecma Olympus 593

Comparable engines

- Pratt & Whitney J75

Related lists

- List of aircraft engines
