= Anti-aircraft missile =

Anti-aircraft missiles are guided missiles designed to destroy or damage aircraft. These include

- air-to-air missile, a missile fired from an aircraft for the purpose of destroying another aircraft
- subsurface-to-air missile, a missile usually launched from below water
- surface-to-air missile, a missile designed to be launched from the ground to destroy aircraft or other missiles
