= Rolls-Royce Marine Olympus =

Marine gas turbine

Marine Olympus
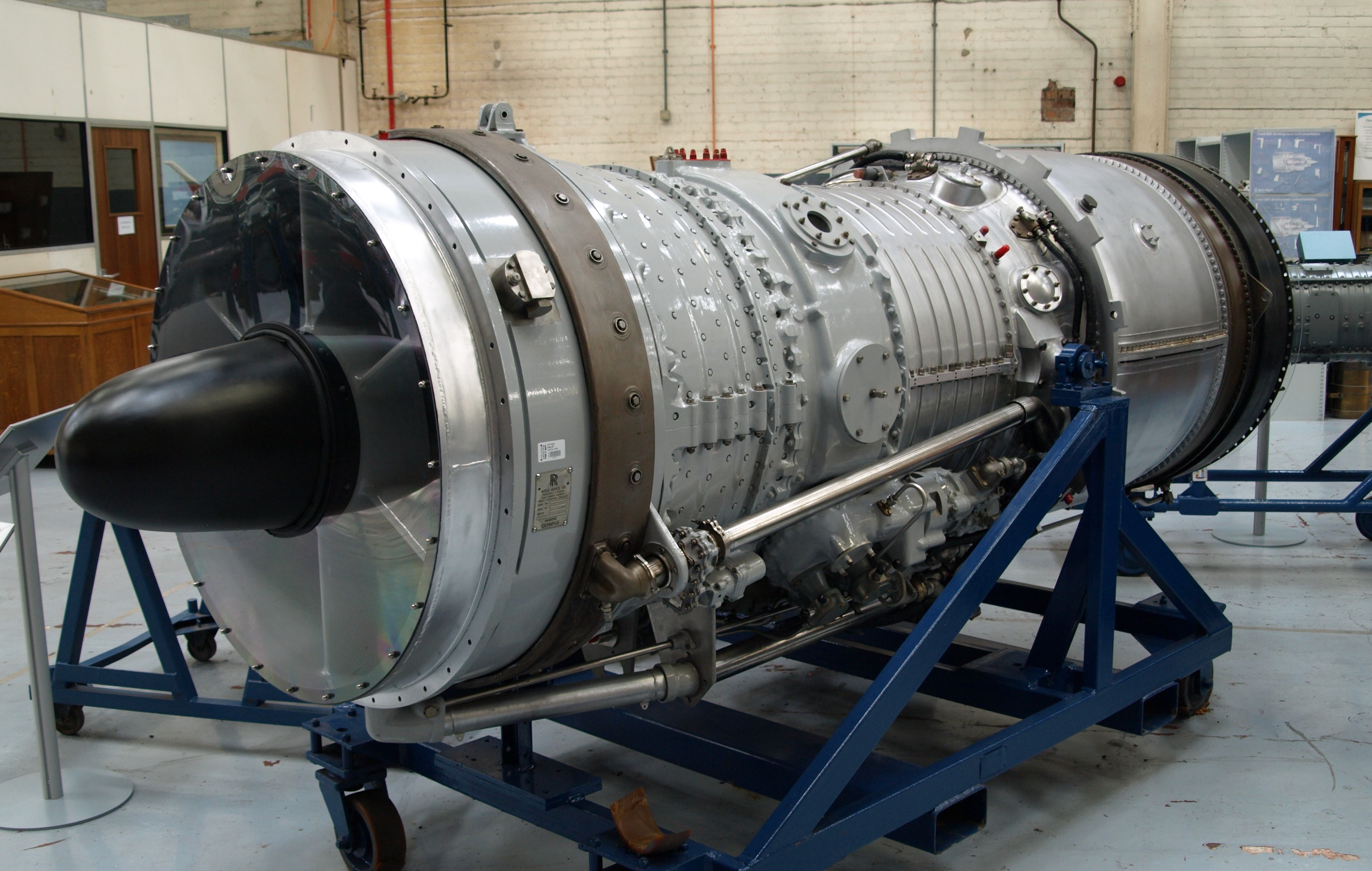
- Marine Olympus on display at the Rolls-Royce Heritage Trust, Derby
- Type: Gas turbine
- National origin: United Kingdom
- Manufacturer: Bristol Siddeley; Rolls-Royce Limited
- First run: 1960s
- Developed from: Rolls-Royce Olympus

The Rolls-Royce Marine Olympus is a marine gas turbine based on the Rolls-Royce Olympus aircraft turbojet engine.

== History ==
The first Marine Olympus was built for the German Navy. In 1962 BSEL was contracted to provide the gas-generator and Brown Boveri was contracted to provide a two-stage long-life marine power turbine. A test bed was built for extensive shore trials. Construction of the ship which was intended for gas-turbine power was abandoned. Test running of the next marine Olympus began in 1966. The power turbine was of a single stage operating at 5,600 rpm utilising wide-chord blades. Beginning its sea trials in early 1968, Turunmaa, a 700-ton corvette of the Finnish Navy was the first Olympus-powered warship to enter service, some six months before HMS Exmouth, the first British ship which had been refitted to trial the propulsion system for the Royal Navy.

The TM1 and TM2 variants comprised a power turbine baseplate carrying the turbine and the gas generator mountings, and differed significantly only in the construction of the power turbine structure, which was a steel casting on the TM1 and a fabrication on the TM2. All TM1 and TM2 installations were fitted with an A-rated gas generator, serial numbers 2013xx.

The TM3 comprised a similar power turbine baseplate plus a gas generator enclosure, an air intake enclosure, and many support services including ventilation and fire extinguishing systems. All TM3 installations were fitted with a B-rated gas generator, serial numbers 2017xx.

== Variants ==
=== Olympus TM1 ===
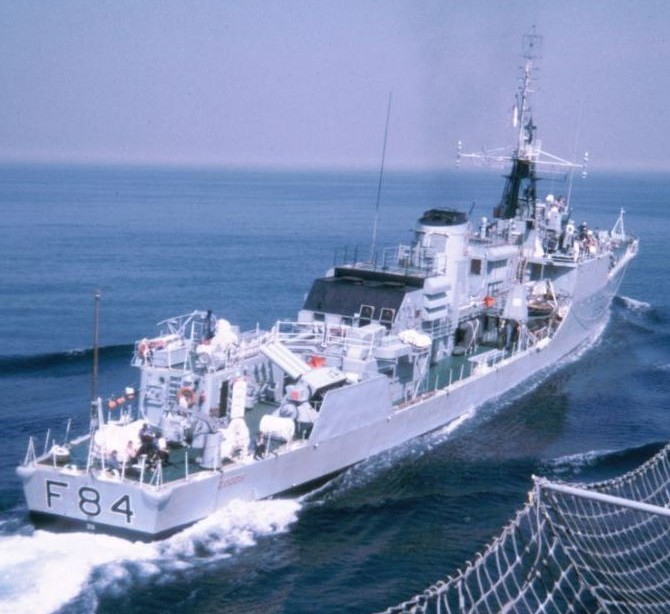
HMS Exmouth, the first British warship to be entirely propelled by gas turbines.

23,200 shp (17,300 kW) nominal. Installed ratings quoted where known.

- Finnish Navy
  - Turunmaa-class corvettes — one Olympus, three diesels.
- Royal Navy
  - HMS Exmouth — one Olympus derated to 15,000 shp (11,000 kW), two Proteus.
  - Type 82 destroyer, HMS Bristol — two Olympus, two steam turbines.

=== Olympus TM2 ===
23,200 shp (17,300 kW) nominal. Installed ratings quoted where known.

- Iranian Navy
  - Alvand-class frigates — two Olympus at 23,000 shp (17,000 kW), two diesel.
- Royal Malaysian Navy
  - KD Rahmat frigate — one Olympus at 19,500 shp (14,500 kW), one diesel.
- Libyan Navy
  - Dat Assawari frigate — two Olympus at 23,200 shp (17,300 kW), two diesel.

=== Olympus TM3 ===
28,000 shp (21,000 kW) nominal. Installed ratings quoted where known.

- Royal Navy
  - Invincible-class aircraft carriers — four Olympus at 25,000 shp (19,000 kW).
  - Type 42 destroyers — two Olympus at 25,000 shp (19,000 kW), two Tyne.
  - Type 21 frigates — two Olympus at 28,000 shp (21,000 kW), two Tyne.
  - Type 22 frigates Batch 1 and 2 — two Olympus, two Tyne.
- Argentine Navy
  - Almirante Brown-class destroyer — two Olympus at 25,800 shp (19,200 kW), two Tyne.
- Brazilian Navy
  - Niterói-class frigate — two Olympus TB3B at 28,000 shp (21,000 kW), four MTU 16V956 TB91.
- Nigerian Navy
  - NNS Aradu frigate — two Olympus, two diesels.
- Royal Thai Navy
  - HTMS Makut Rajakumarn frigate — one Olympus at 19,500 shp (14,500 kW), one diesel.
- Hellenic Navy
  - Elli-class frigates — two Olympus, two Tyne.
- French Navy
  - Georges Leygues-class destroyers — two Olympus at 26,000 shp (19,000 kW), two diesel.
- Belgian Navy
  - Wielingen-class frigates — one Olympus at 27,575 shp (20,563 kW), two diesel.
- Royal Netherlands Navy
  - Tromp-class frigates — two Olympus at 20,000 shp (15,000 kW), two Tyne.
  - Kortenaer-class frigates — two Olympus at 25,700 shp (19,200 kW), two Tyne.
  - Jacob van Heemskerck-class frigates — two Olympus at 25,700 shp (19,200 kW), two Tyne.
- Japan Maritime Self Defense Force
  - Ishikari-class destroyer escort — one Olympus, one diesel.
  - Yūbari-class destroyer escort — one Olympus at 24,700 shp (18,400 kW), one diesel.
  - Hatsuyuki-class destroyer — two Olympus, two Tyne.
- Indonesian Navy
  - Dewantara-class corvette — one Olympus TM3B, two diesel.
  - Fatahillah-class corvette — one Olympus TM3B, two diesel.

== Specifications ==
Data from Rolls-Royce Heritage Trust

==== General characteristics ====
- Type: Gas generator
- Length:
- Diameter:
- Dry weight:

==== Components ====
- Compressor: 5-stage LP, 7-stage HP
- Combustors: 8 chamber, cannular
- Turbine: Single-stage LP and HP

==== Performance ====
- Maximum power output: 28,500 shp (21.4 MW)
- Specific fuel consumption: 0.47 lb/hp/hr (0.287 kg/KWh)

== See also ==
Related development

- Rolls-Royce Olympus
