= Crotale (missile) =

Short-range anti-air missile

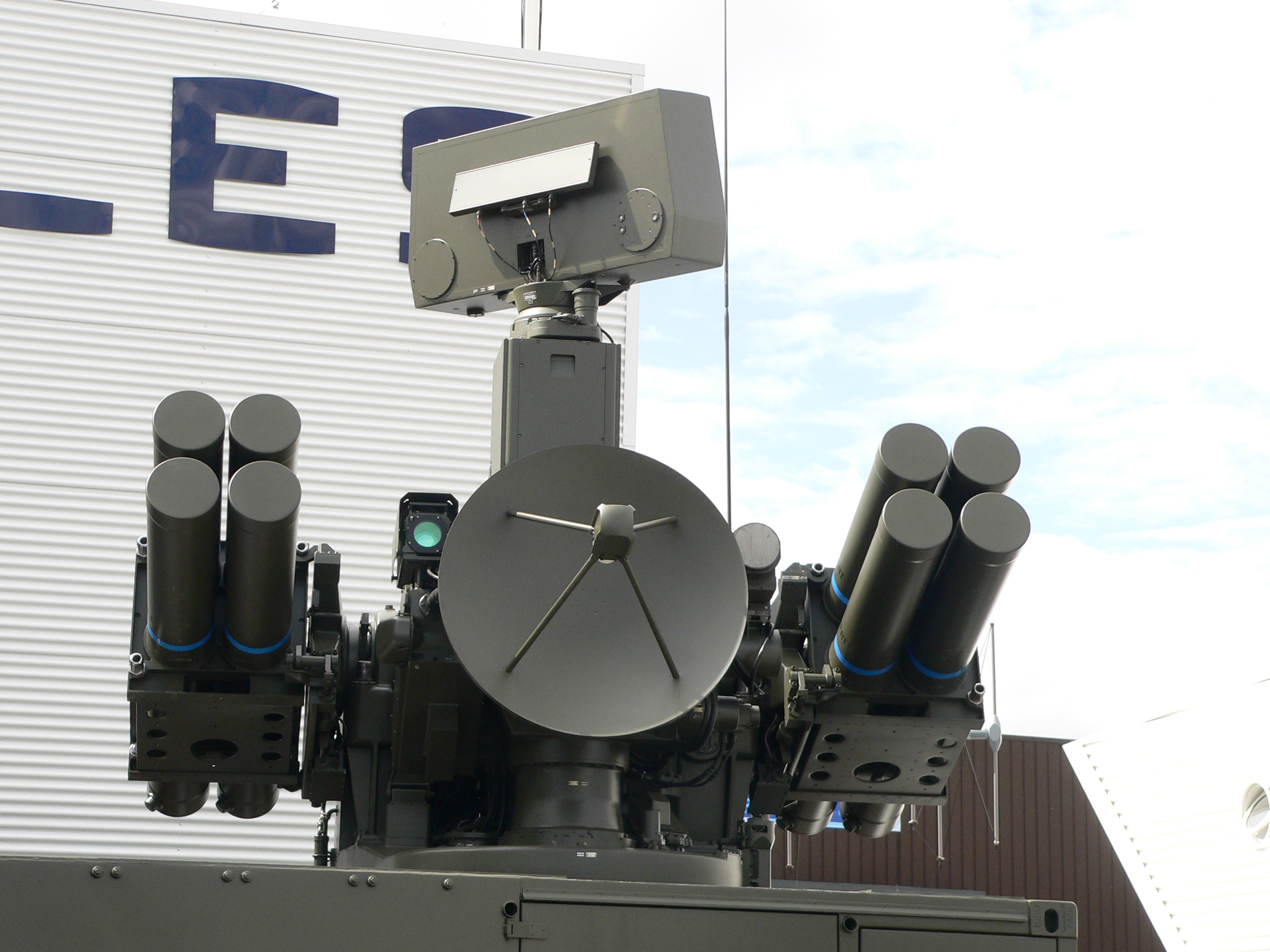
- Crotale NG at the Paris Air Show, 2007
- Type: Surface-to-air missile system
- Place of origin: France

Service history
- Used by: See Operators
- Wars: Chadian-Libyan conflict South African Border War; Russian invasion of Ukraine

Production history
- Designed: Late 1960s
- Manufacturer: Thales Group; Samsung Group
- Produced: Early 1970s
- No. built: 6,600 missiles (R440)

Specifications
- Mass: R440: 80 kg VT-1: 76kg
- Length: R440: 2.89 m VT-1: 2.35 m
- Diameter: R440: 15 cm VT-1: 16.5cm
- Wingspan: 54 cm
- Warhead: forward-directed blast warhead (R.440 and R.460) or blast-fragmentation warhead (VT-1)
- Warhead weight: R440: 15kg VT-1: 13kg
- Detonation mechanism: infrared fuse, converted to RF fuse in later models.
- Engine: Lens 3 solid-fuel boost-glide (R.440)
- Operational range: VT-1: 11 km Mk3: 15 km
- Flight ceiling: VT-1: 6,000 m Mk3: 9,000 m
- Maximum speed: R440: 800 m/s (Mach 2.3); VT-1: 1250 m/s (Mach 3.6)
- Guidance system: Automatic command to line of sight
- Steering system: Canard and tail axis control
- Launch platform: Mobile Launcher, Naval Launch

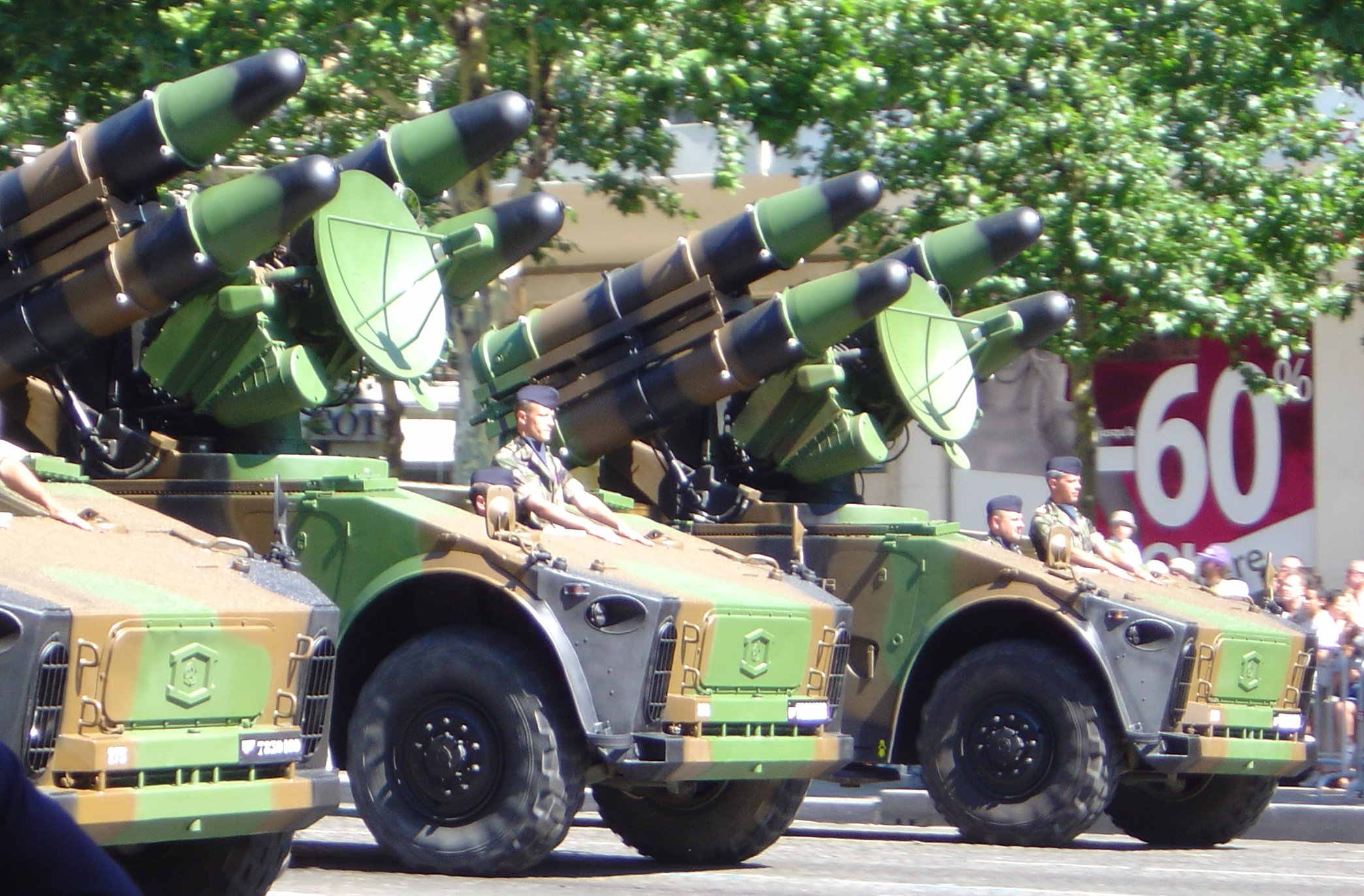
Crotale missile launchers of the French Air Force.

The Crotale (English: "Pit Viper" or "Rattlesnake") is a French, all-weather, SHORAD surface-to-air missile system developed to intercept airborne ranged weapons and aircraft, from cruise or anti-ship missiles to helicopters, UAVs or low-flying high-performance fighter aircraft. It was developed by Thomson CSF Matra (now Thales Group) and consists of a mobile land-based variant as well as various naval ones.

== Development ==
Originally the Crotale R440 system was developed by Rockwell International and Thomson-Houston (and Mistral) in France for South Africa, where it was named Cactus. However, the achievements of the system impressed the French Armed Forces, who purchased the system both for the air force and for the navy.

The French Air Force utilized a 4x4 wheeled vehicle developed by Hotchkiss et Cie, the P4R, armed with four missiles. A more mobile system to protect ground forces was mounted on the chassis of the French AMX-30 main battle tank. This was adopted with a larger and more capable missile by Saudi Arabia as Shahine. At the same time, the number of launchers was increased to six. In Finnish Army service, the Crotale NG system has been mounted on Sisu Pasi vehicles. Here the number of launchers is eight.

The Crotale system has also been installed on various military ships. For instance, the French Navy La Fayette-class frigates have a Crotale 8-tubed launcher near the helicopter flight deck. The firing system includes the main sensors of the ship, the firing system of the turret, and a central coordination system. The turret holds eight missiles ready for launch in watertight containers. The magazine behind the turret holds 18 missiles.

The automatic command to line-of-sight guidance system uses both radar and IRST to locate a target and to track it and the missile.

== Crotale NG ==
A modernized version, the Crotale NG (New Generation), entered production in 1990. This version used the new VT-1 missile with Mach 3.5 speed, load factor to 35G, 11 km range, 13 kg warhead (8 m kill-zone) and 6,000 m ceiling. VT-1 missile was developed by LTV Missiles and Electronics Group (now Lockheed Martin Missiles and Fire Control and solid rocket motor for it was developed by Morton Thiokol. The system includes a S-band Pulse Doppler radar (20 km), Ku-band TWT tracking radar (30 km), Thermal camera (19 km), Daylight CCD camera (15 km), and an IR localiser. An early '90s proposal to fit the system (in its eight-round form) to a Leclerc tank chassis in order to provide a battlefield air defence vehicle for protecting armored formations on the move was not realised due to post-Cold War cutbacks.

== K-SAM Pegasus (K31 Cheonma) ==
In 1999, the Republic of Korea Armed Forces awarded a contract to Samsung and Thales to jointly develop a South Korean-augmented Crotale NG system for the K-SAM Pegasus short-range air defense system. A new sensor system was jointly developed by Samsung and Thales to meet the required operational capability of the upcoming K-SAM Pegasus, as well as a new indigenous missile by LIG Nex1. The electronics and radars were developed by Samsung Electronics. Doosan DST integrated this modified Crotale NG system with a K200 vehicle. 48 units were initially produced for a price-tag of 330 million Euros. A second batch of 66 units was ordered in 2003, valued at 470 million Euros.

== Multi-Shield 100 ==
Thales revealed an updated Crotale NG system with Shikra radar at the Paris Air Show in 2007. The system combines Crotale Mk3 VT-1 missile and Shikra multi-beam search radar, with 150 km (detection range). Thales has demonstrated that the system's VT-1 missile has extended range to 15 km.

== Technology ==
The Crotale missile system consists of two components; a vehicle for transport, equipped with 2-8 launchers; a tracking radar located between the launchers. A second vehicle carries the surveillance radar. The radar surveillance vehicle can be connected to several launcher vehicles, in order to achieve an effective air-defence system. The Crotale NG has incorporated both the launcher and the surveillance radar in one vehicle.

The missile is propelled by a solid-propellant rocket motor and can accelerate to a maximum speed of Mach 2.3 in two seconds. The missile is sent guidance commands by the base unit directing keeping it on the line of sight until its infrared proximity fuze senses that it is near its target and explodes.

The surveillance radar and fire direction radar have a range of 20 km and the TV link works up to 15 km. The TV guidance system uses both regular and infrared cameras. The system can follow 8 targets simultaneously, and the guidance radar can follow both hovering helicopters as well as fighters exceeding Mach 2. The Crotale can also use surveillance data from other systems, data from optical surveillance and from the general aerial picture from the national air defence communications system.

== Variants ==
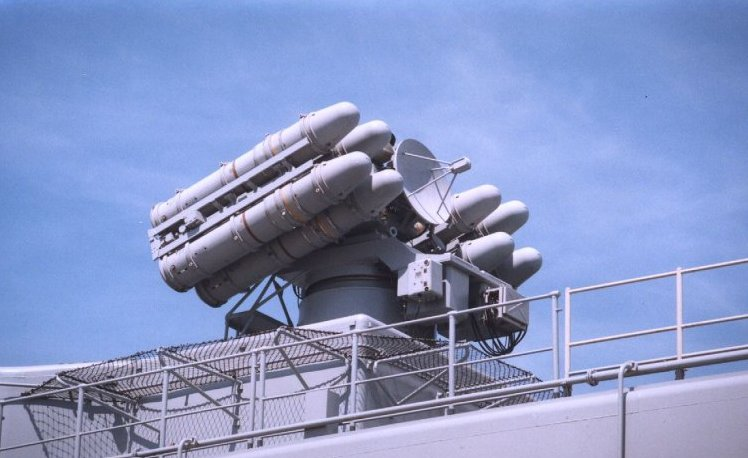
Crotale R440 launchers aboard the frigate Tourville

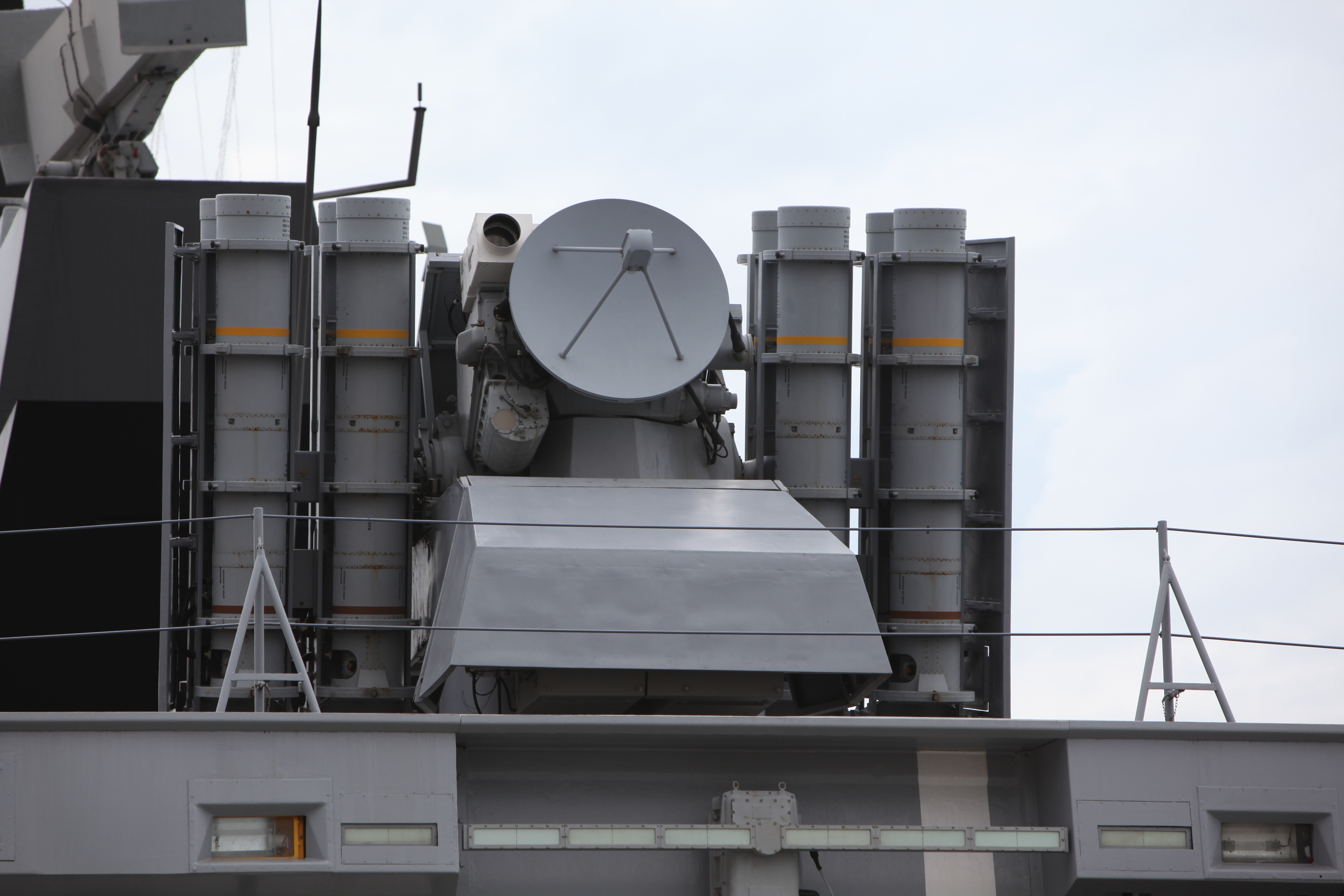
Stealth casing of the La Fayette-class frigate Surcouf.

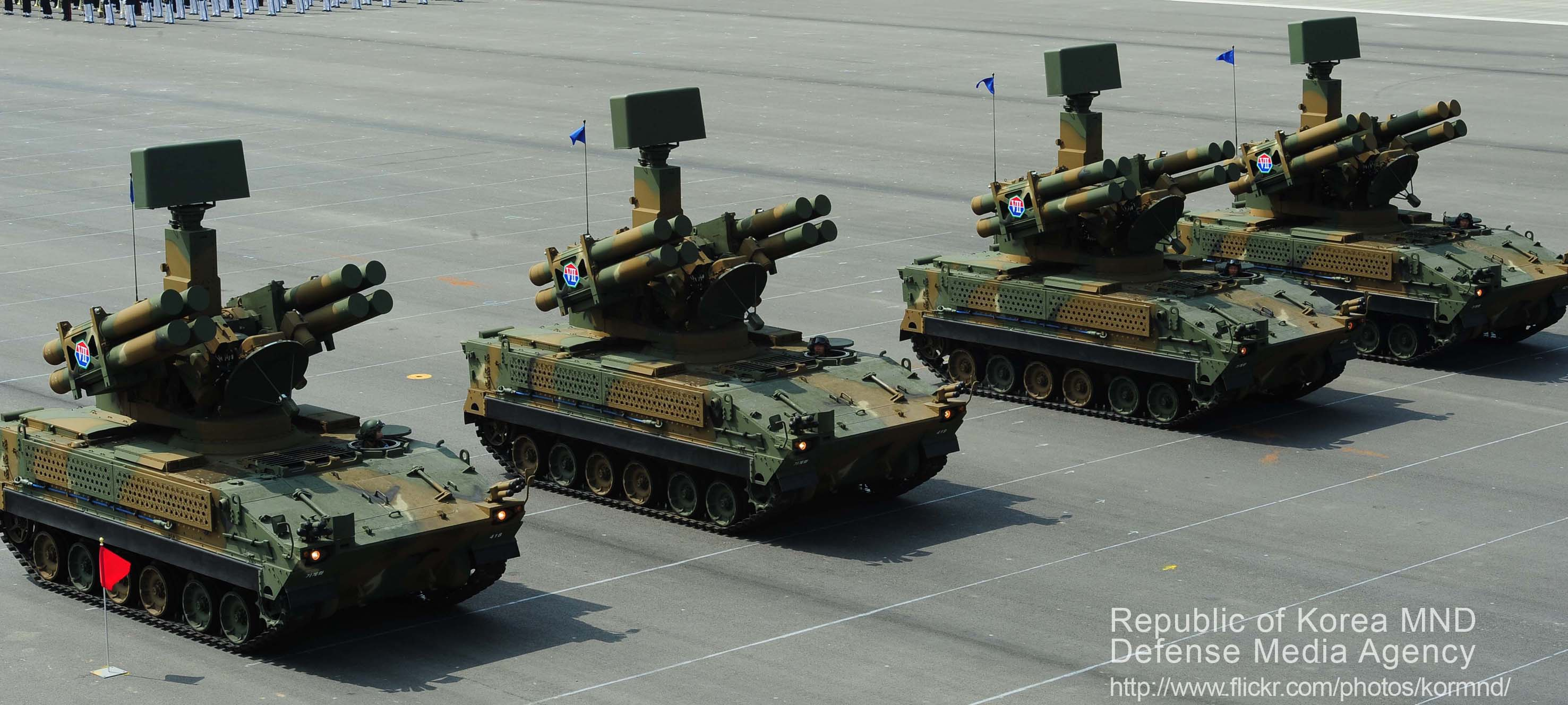
South Korean K-SAM Pegasus

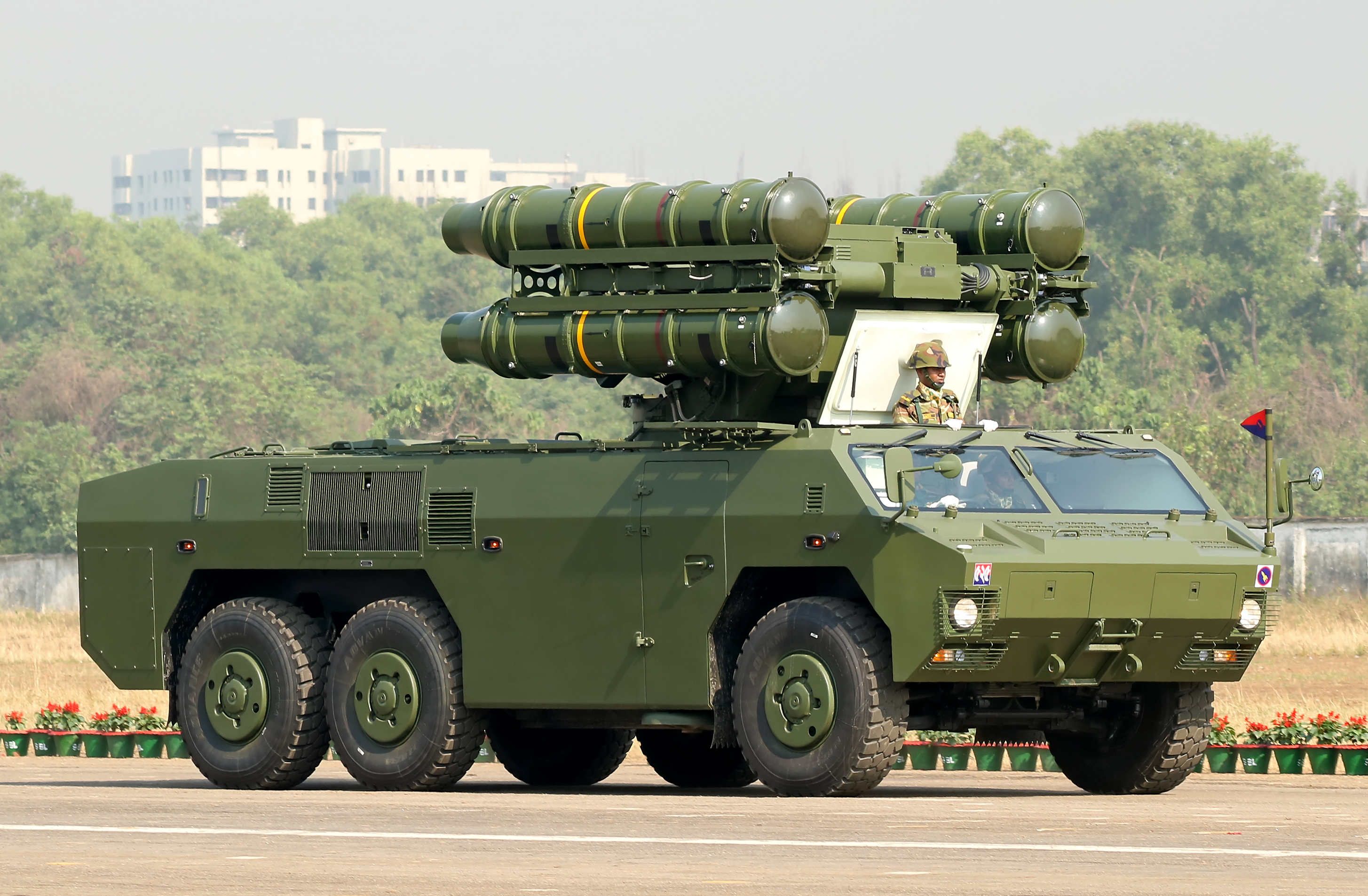
Chinese variant FM-90 (HQ-7B) of the Bangladesh Army

R440 Crotale
The original Crotale SAM system, with both land and sea (Sea Crotale) systems. Over 330 systems and several thousand missiles were produced and exported to more than 15 countries.
R460 SICA (Shahine)
Thomson-CSF (now Thales) developed a specific version of the Crotale known as "Shahine" for Saudi Arabia. The system became operational in 1980. The main visible differences are mainly the carrier (an AMX 30 armoured carrier instead of the non-protected classic carrier), and that it carries a six-missile firing unit (instead of four). The purpose of the changes was to allow the Shahine firing and acquisition units to follow and protect the armoured units of the Saudi Armed Forces on the battlefield. The Shahine units were among the first vehicles to liberate Kuwait City in February 1991 – a picture taken of the scene was widely publicised by Newsweek magazine.

Crotale NG (VT-1)
An updated version, New Generation. Finland was the first operator of the system. The cost of the system is roughly 8 million euros (excluding the vehicle). Greece is another user, and paid 1 billion French Francs in 1998 for 11 systems: 9 for the Hellenic Air Force and 2 for the Hellenic Navy. In 2002 euros, that would have amounted up to 12 million euros per unit.
Crotale Mk.3 (system)
In January 2008, France test-fired the new Crotale Mk.3 system at the CELM missile launch test center in Biscarrosse. The Crotale Mk.3 system's VT1 missile successfully intercepted a Banshee target drone at 970 metre altitude and 8 km range in 11 seconds on 15 January 2008. Later, on 31 January 2008, the system successfully intercepted another target drone at a 500-metre altitude and 15 km range in 35 seconds.
HQ-7
HQ-7 is a Chinese variant of Crotale.

== Operators ==
Map of Crotale operators in blue with former operators in red

=== Current operators ===
Bahrain
Royal Bahraini Army
Egypt
Egyptian Air Defense Forces (test in 1976)
Finland
The Finnish Army operates 21 Crotale NGs on Sisu XA-181 vehicles, designated ITO90M.
France
naval Crotale and land-based Crotale NG (12 systems)
Greece
Crotale NG, used by Hellenic Air Force (9 systems) and Hellenic Navy (2 naval systems).
Iran
Ya Zahra air defense system is an unlicensed Iranian copy of an unlicensed Chinese-copy of Crotale missiles.
Oman
Crotale NG
Pakistan
Pakistan Air Force
Republic of Korea
K-SAM Pegasus (114 systems)
Saudi Arabia
Shahine, Crotale
United Arab Emirates
Ukraine
Ukraine operates two Crotale batteries

=== Former operators ===
Iraq
Despite a lingering rumor, Iraq never had the Crotale system.
Libya
First delivery in 1973.
Portugal
Portuguese Army (2 launching units with 1 radar delivered in 1974) Sold in 1976.
South Africa
delivered from 1971 to 1973
Chile
Chilean Air Force
Morocco
Royal Moroccan Army

== See also ==
- Roland missile (Franco-German surface-to-air missile)
- LFK NG (the cancelled surface-to-air missile of the German Army)
