= Chaff =

Protective casings of the seeds of cereal grain

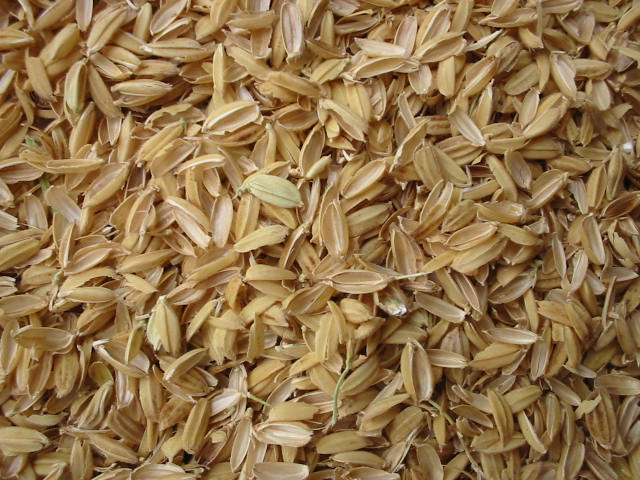
Rice chaff

Chaff (/tʃæf/; also UK: /tʃɑːf/) is dry, scale-like plant material such as the protective seed casings of cereal grains, the scale-like parts of flowers, or finely chopped straw. Chaff cannot be digested by humans, but it may be fed to livestock, ploughed into soil, or burned.

== Etymology ==
"Chaff" comes from Middle English chaf, from Old English ceaf, related to Old High German cheva, "husk".

== Grain chaff ==
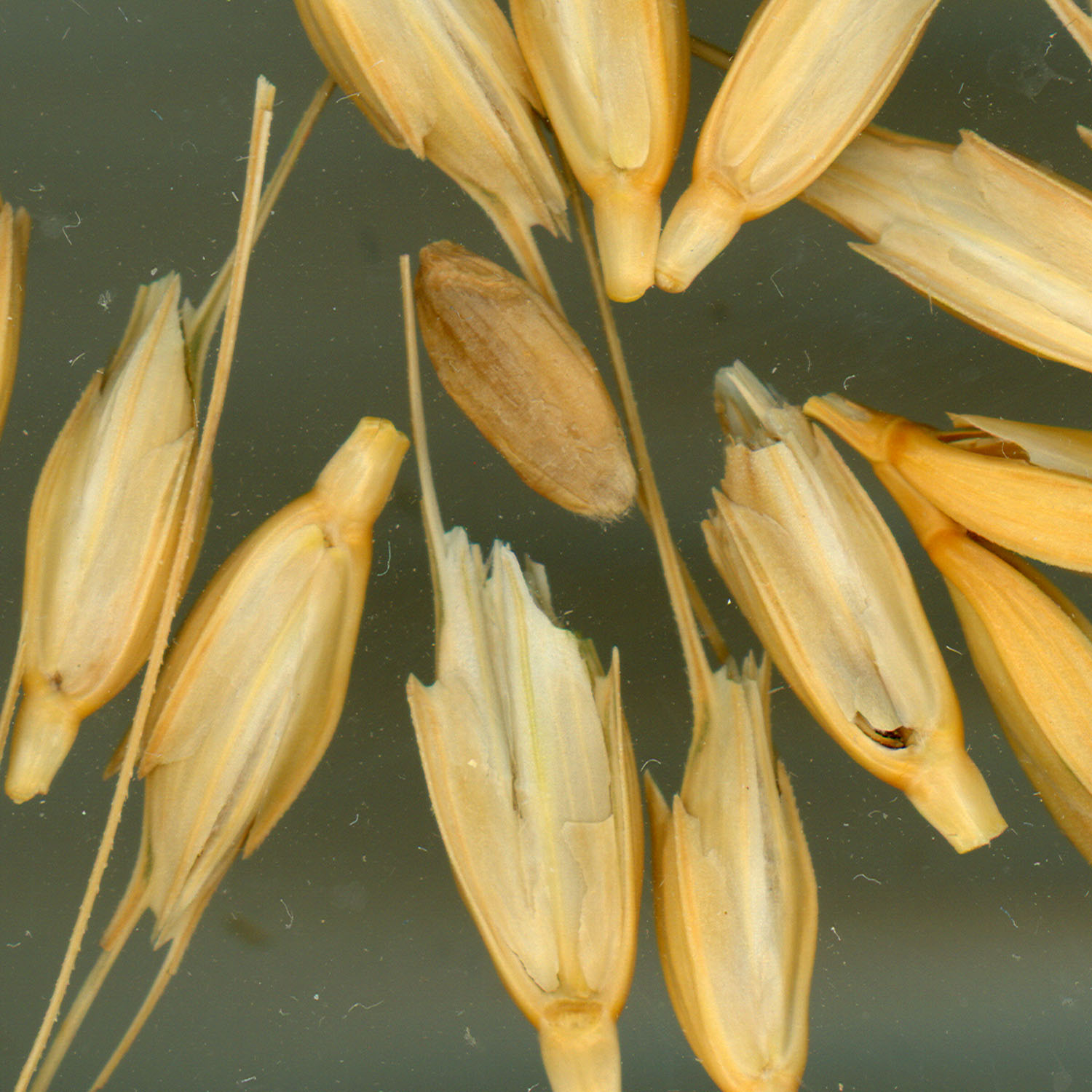
Spikelets of a hulled wheat, einkorn

In grasses (including cereals such as rice, barley, oats, and wheat), the ripe seed is surrounded by thin, dry, scaly bracts (called glumes, lemmas, and paleas), forming a dry husk (or hull) around the grain. Once it is removed, it is often referred to as chaff.

In wild cereals and in the primitive domesticated einkorn, emmer and spelt wheats, the husks enclose each seed tightly. Before the grain can be used, the husks must be removed.

The process of loosening the chaff from the grain so as to remove it is called threshing before drying – traditionally done by milling or pounding, making it finer like flour. Separating remaining loose chaff from the grain is called winnowing – traditionally done by repeatedly tossing the grain up into a light wind, which gradually blows the lighter chaff away. This method typically uses a broad, plate-shaped basket or similar receptacle to hold and collect the winnowed grain as it falls back down.

Domesticated grains such as durum and common wheat have been bred to have chaff that is easily removed. These varieties are known as "free-threshing" or "naked".

Chaff should not be confused with bran, which is a finer, scaly material that is part of the grain itself.

== Straw chaff ==
Chaff is also made by chopping straw (or sometimes coarse hay) into very short lengths, using a machine called a chaff cutter. Like grain chaff, it is used as animal feed and is a way of making coarse fodder more palatable for livestock.

== Coffee chaff ==
Coffee chaff is produced from the so-called silverskin, the thin inner-parchment layer on dried coffee beans, in the process of coffee roasting.

== Botany ==
In botany, chaff refers to the thin receptacular bracts of many species in the sunflower family Asteraceae and related families. They are modified scale-like leaves surrounding single florets in the flower-head.

== Metaphor ==
Chaff as a waste product from grain processing leads to a metaphorical use of the term, to refer to something seen as worthless. In the Bible, such use is found in Job 13:25, Isaiah 33:11, Psalm 83:13-15, and other places. Chaff also lends its name to a radar countermeasure, composed of small particles dropped from an aircraft.

== Use ==
Hungarian engineer László Schremmer has discovered that the use of chaff-based filters can reduce the arsenic content of water to 3 microgram/litre. This is especially important in areas where the potable water is provided by filtering the water extracted from an underground aquifer.

== See also ==
- Awn (botany)
- Bran
- Biomass
- Combine harvester
- Rice hulls
- Rice huller
- Sifting
