= Cartouche (design) =

Frame for a painted or engraved design

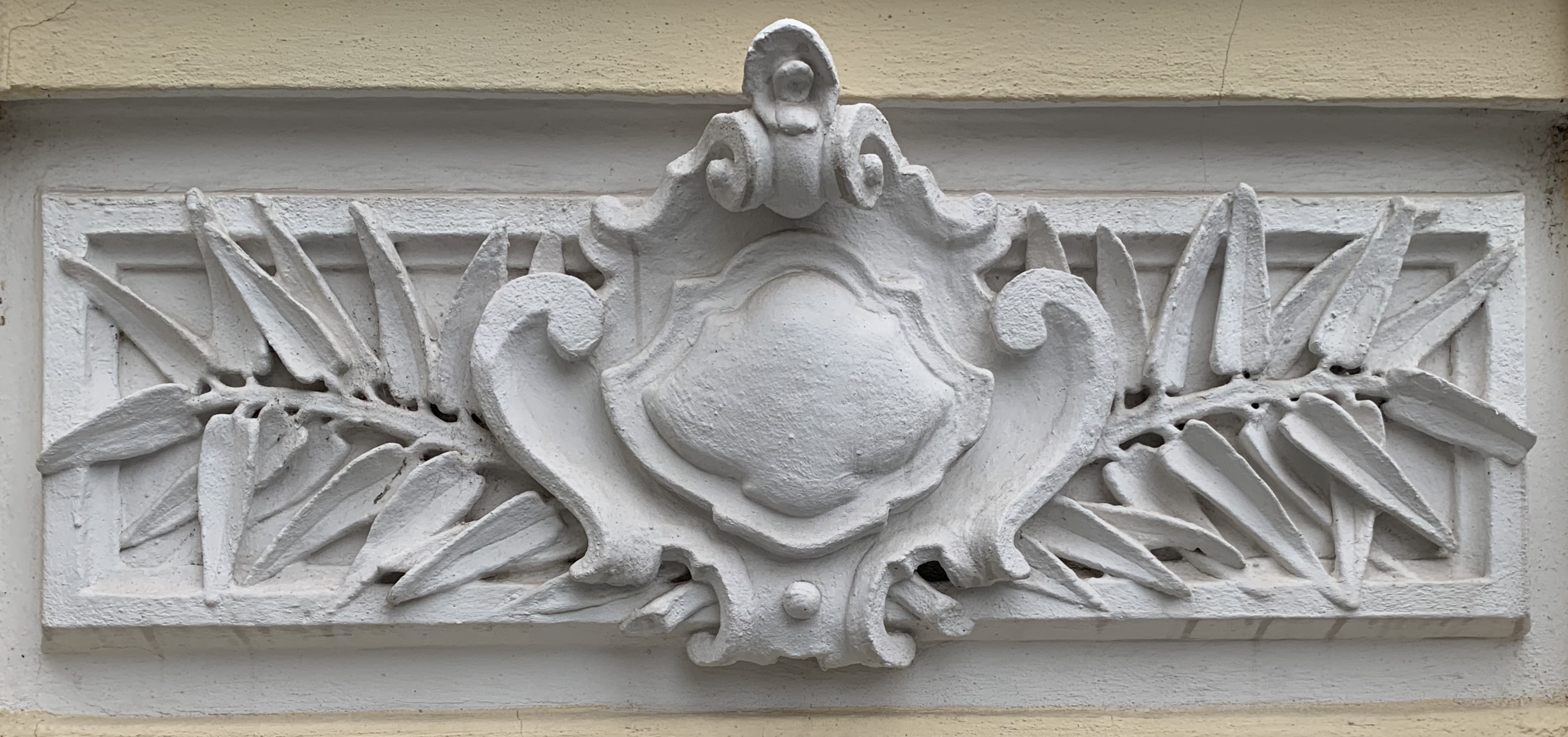
Beaux Arts cartouche of Strada Doctor Dimitrie D. Gerota no. 9, Bucharest, Romania, c. 1900, unknown architect

A cartouche (also cartouch) is an oval or oblong design with a slightly convex surface, typically edged with ornamental scrollwork. It is used to hold a painted or low-relief design. Since the early 16th century, the cartouche is a scrolling frame device, derived originally from Italian cartuccia. Such cartouches are characteristically stretched, pierced and scrolling.

Another cartouche figures prominently in the 16th-century title page of Giorgio Vasari's Lives of the Most Excellent Painters, Sculptors, and Architects, framing a minor vignette with a pierced and scrolling papery cartouche.

The engraved trade card of the London clockmaker Percy Webster shows a vignette of the shop in a scrolling cartouche frame of Rococo design that is composed entirely of scrolling devices.

== History ==
=== Antiquity ===
Cartouches are found on buildings, funerary steles and sarcophagi. The cartouche is generally rectangular, delimited by a molding or one or more incised lines, with two symmetrical trapezoids on the lateral edges.

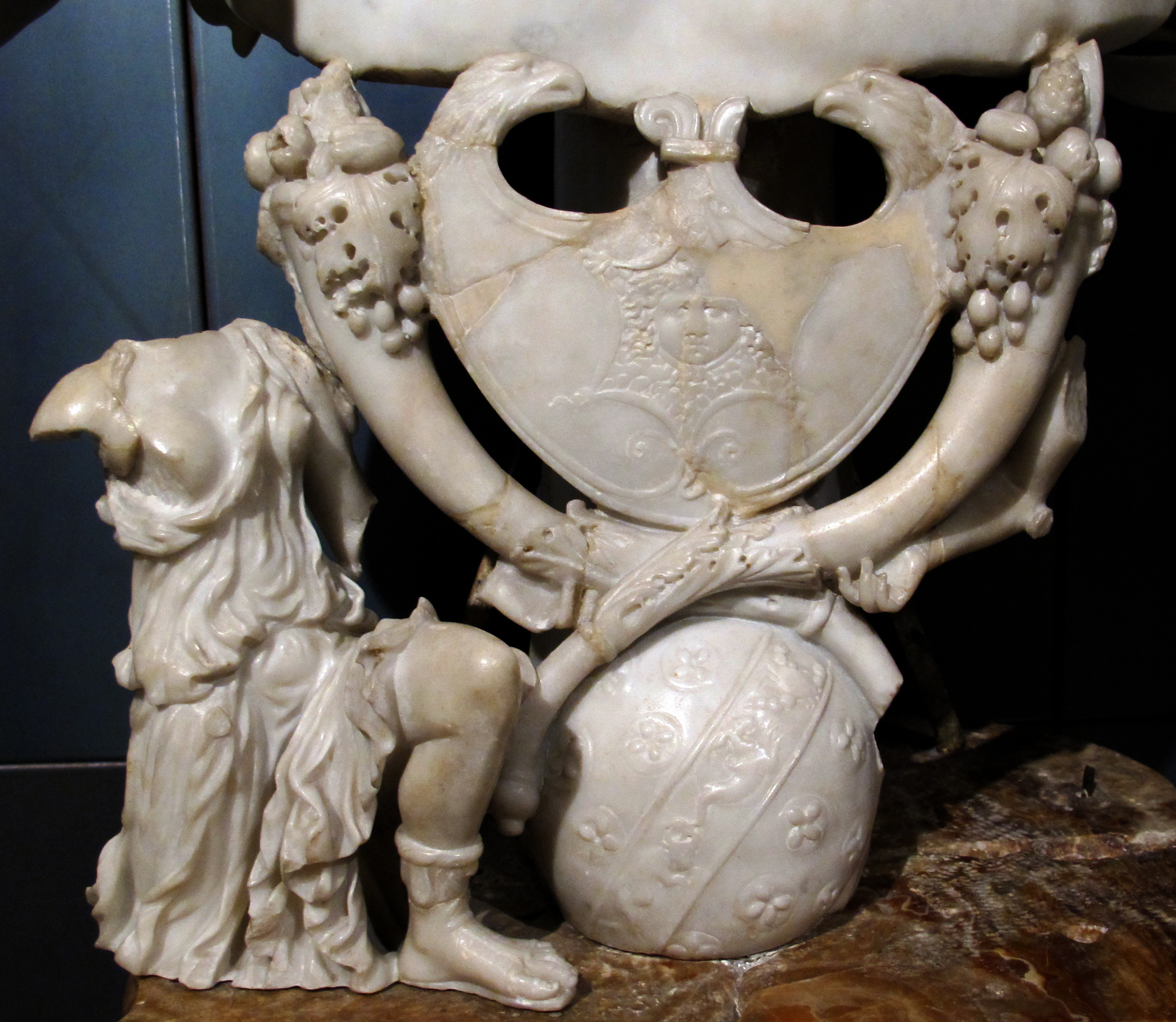
Roman round cartouche, at the base of Commodus as Hercules, early 192 AD, marble, Capitoline Museums, Rome

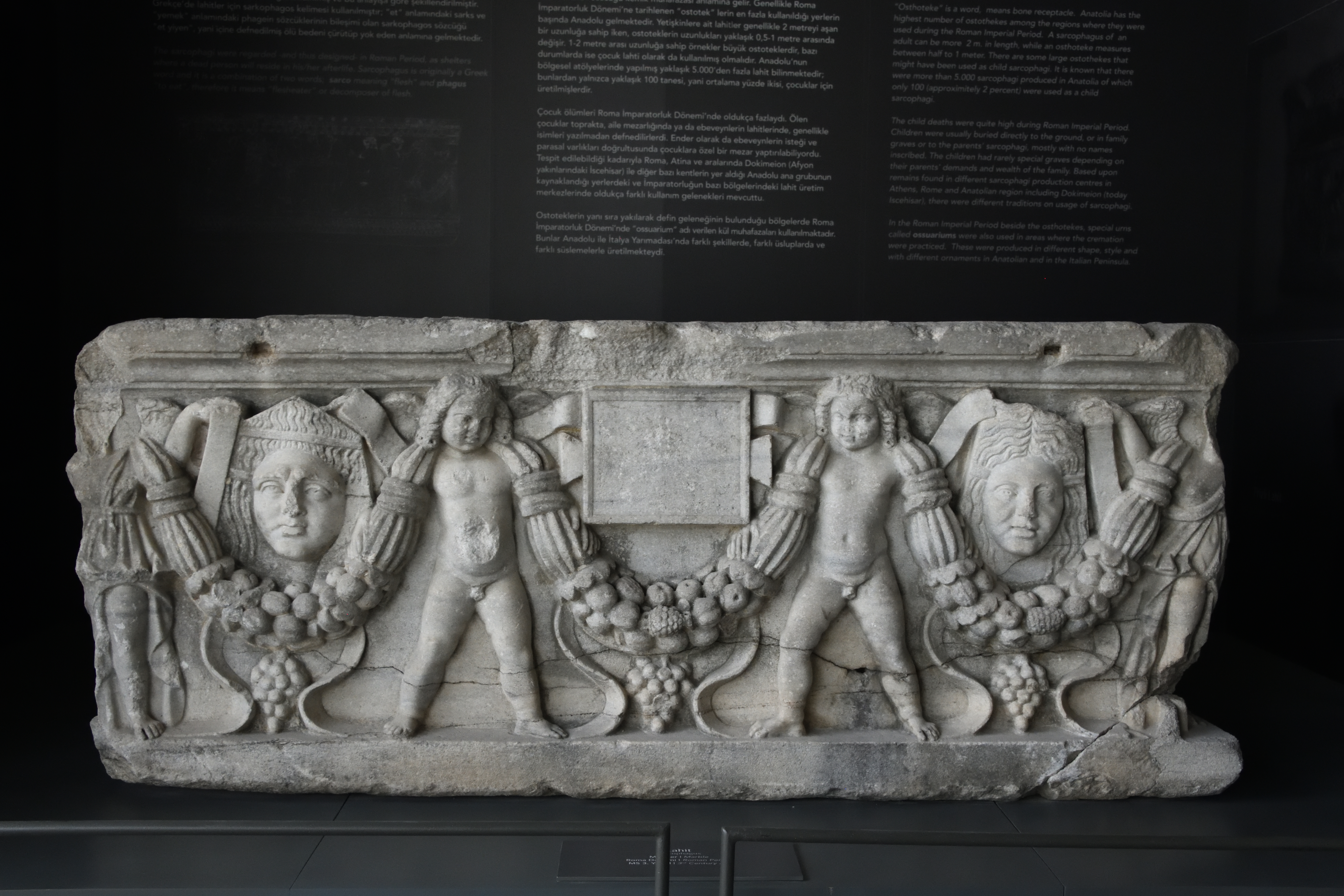
Roman rectangular cartouche on a sarcophagus, 3rd century, marble, Adana Archaeology Museum, Adana, Turkey

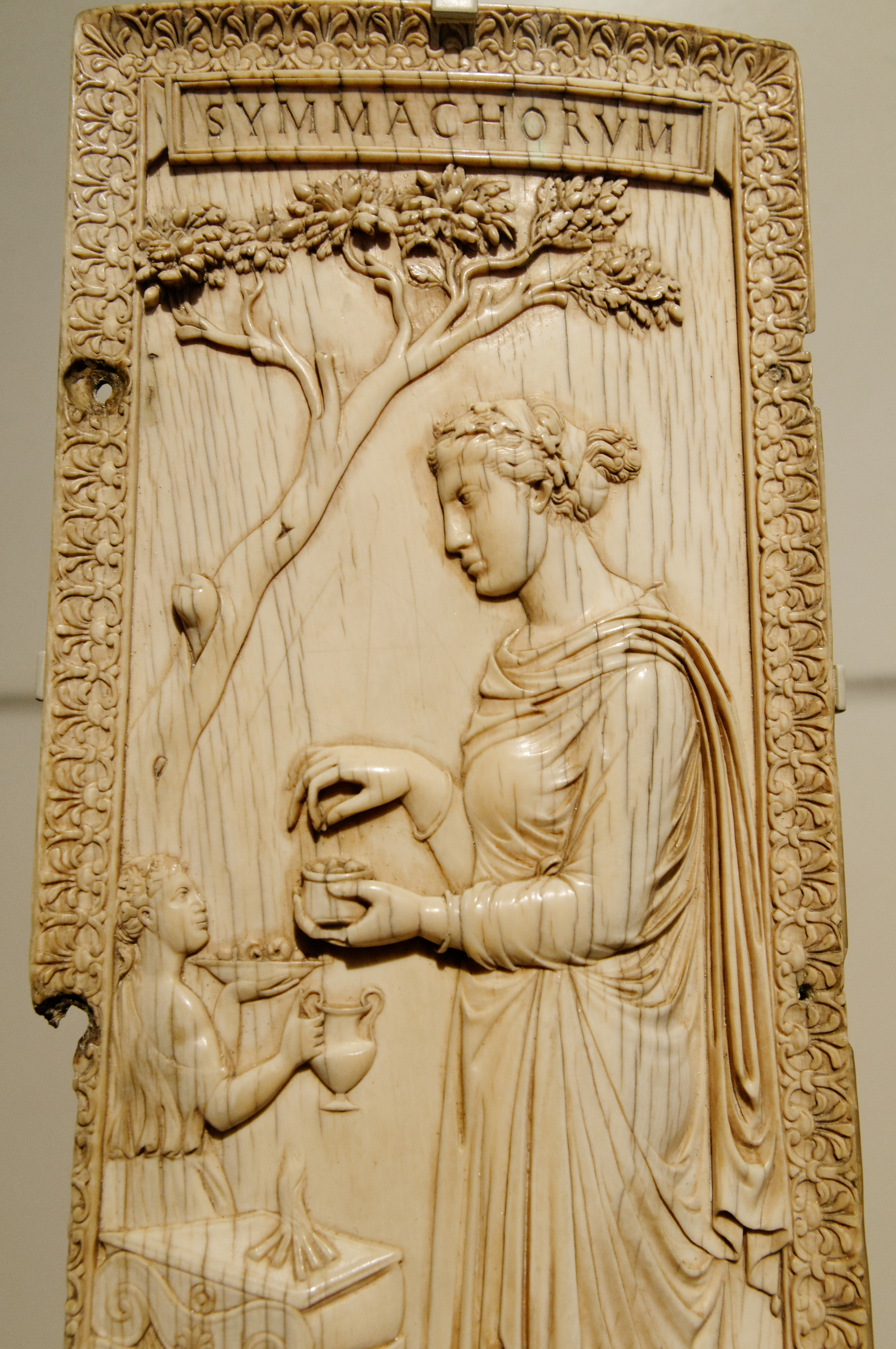
Roman cartouche on the right leaf of the Symmachi–Nicomachi diptych, c.400, ivory, Victoria and Albert Museum, London

=== Chinese ===
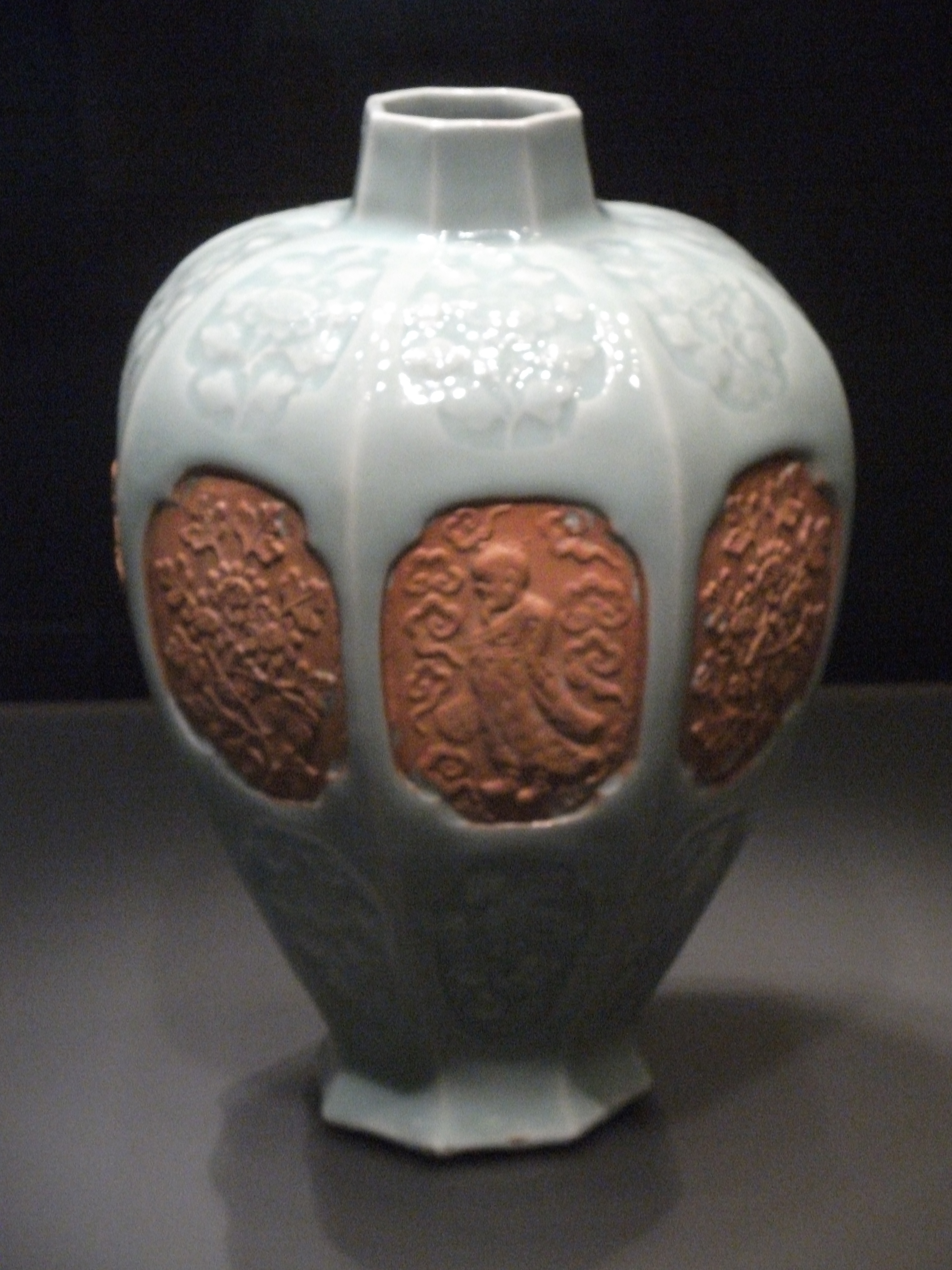
Chinese cartouches on a Longquan ware Vase, 14th century, celadon, British Museum, London

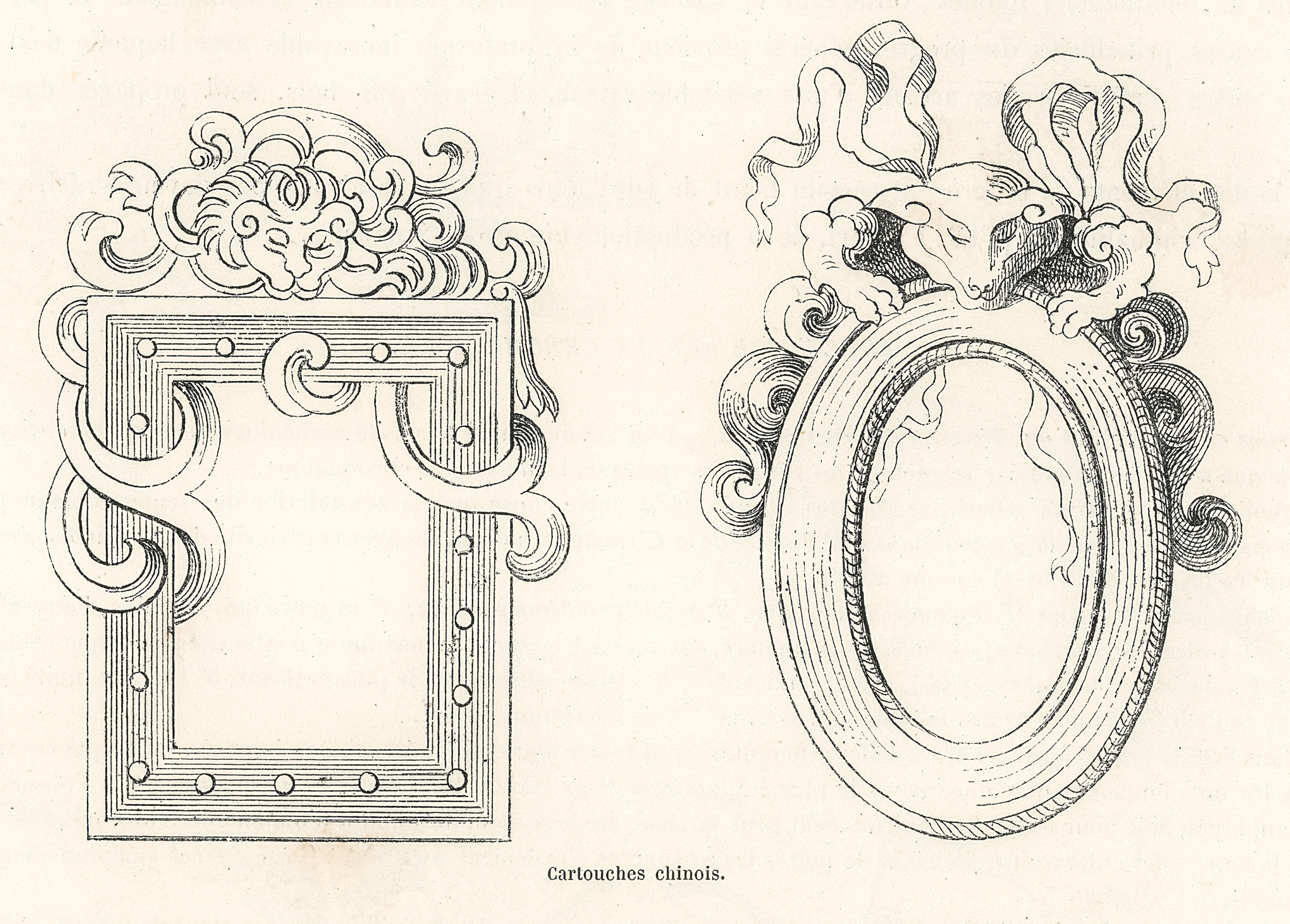
Chinese cartouches, illustration from L'Ornement Polychrome, by Albert Racinet, 1888

=== Islamic ===
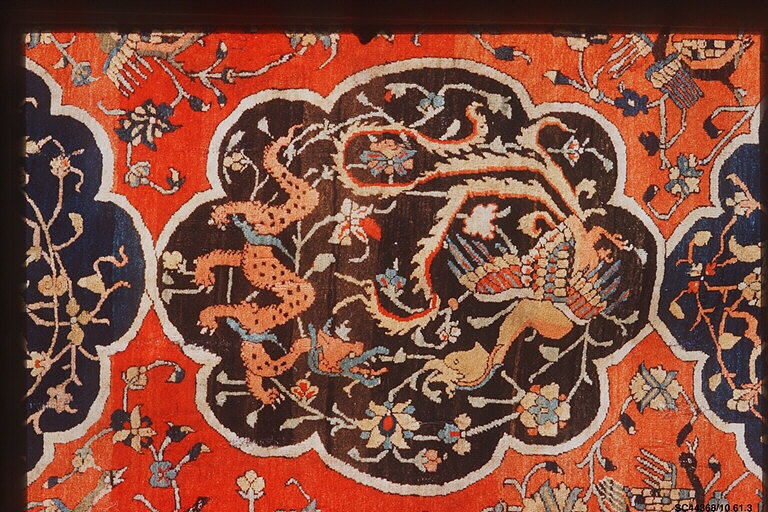
Islamic cartouche on a Persian rug, c.1500-1550, silk and wool, Metropolitan Museum of Art

=== From the Renaissance to Art Deco ===
The Renaissance brought back elements of Greco-Roman culture, including ornaments like the cartouche. Compared to their ancient ancestors, the ones from the Renaissance are usually much more complex. Cartouches continue to be used in styles that succeed the Renaissance. Most have the usual look of a symmetrical oval with scrolls developed during the Renaissance and Baroque periods, but some are highly stylized, showing the diversity of styles popular over time. They were used constantly, and were one of the main motifs of Rococo and Beaux Arts architecture.

Their use started to fade in Art Deco, a style created as a collective effort of multiple French designers to make a new modern style around 1910. This is because artists of this movement tried to create new ornaments for their time, most often stylizing motifs used before, or coming up with completely new ones. Art Deco also followed the principle of simplicity, another reason for the rarity of complex ornaments like cartouches or mascarons in Art Deco.

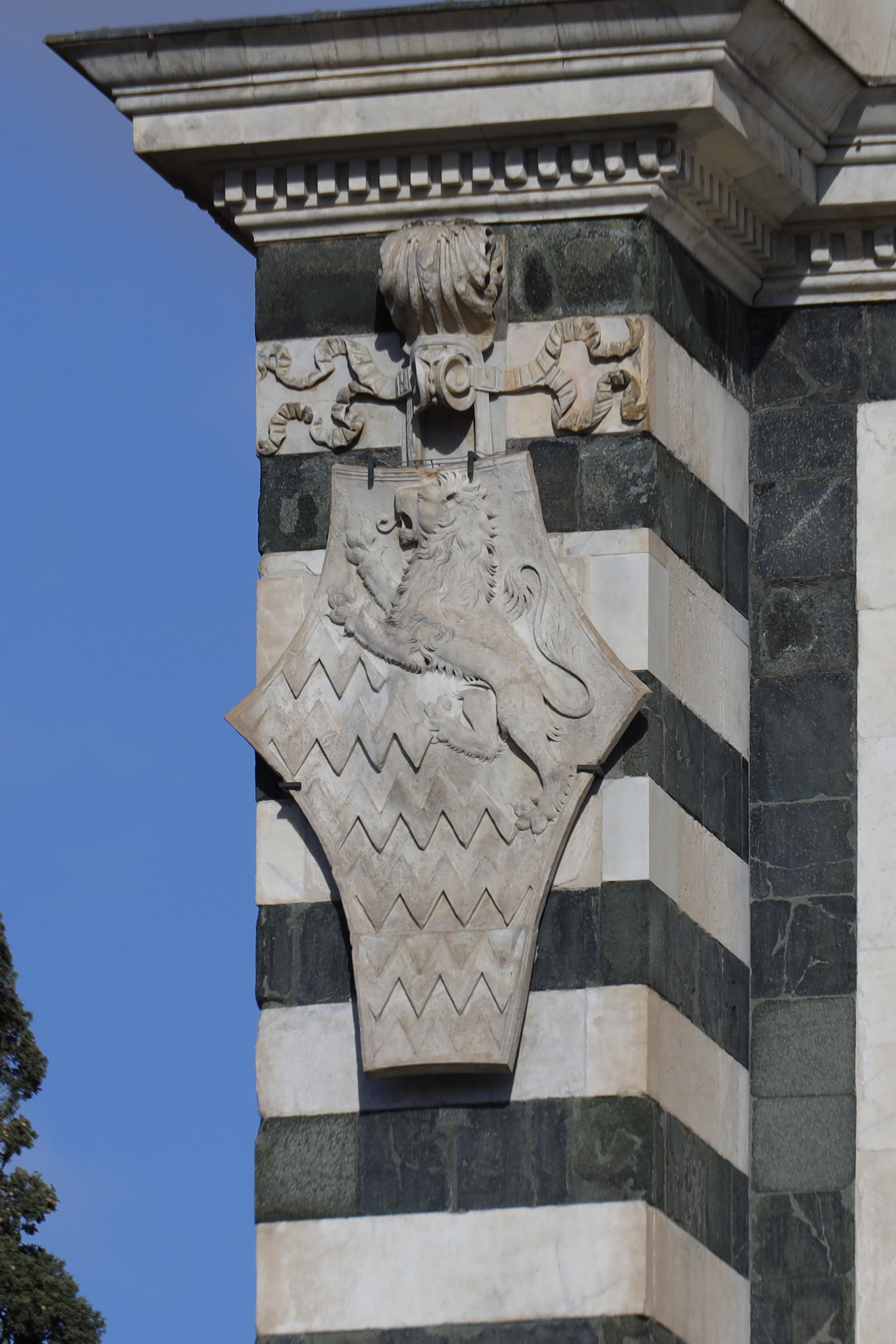
Renaissance cartouche on Santa Maria Novella, Florence, Italy, designed by Leon Battista Alberti, c.1458

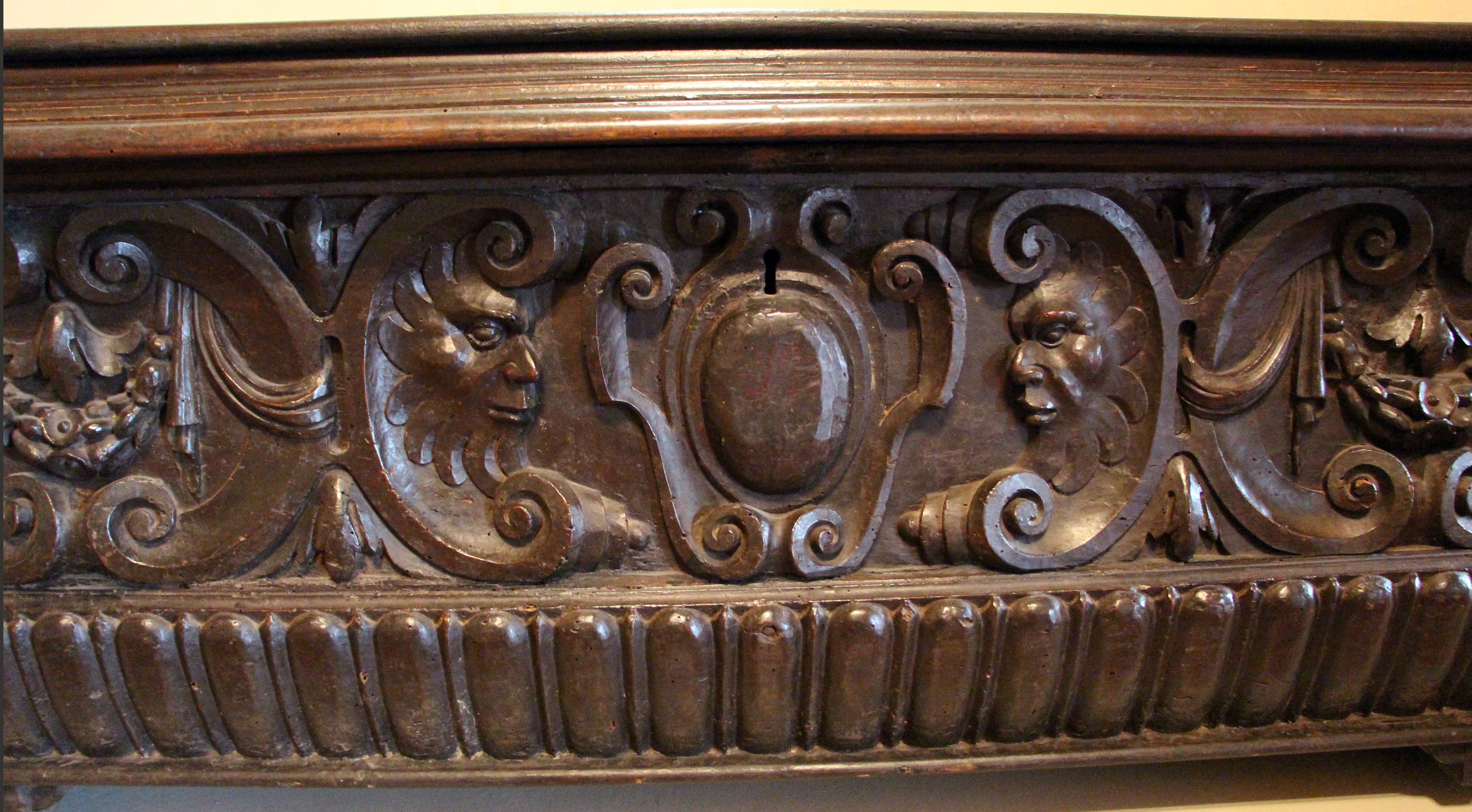
Renaissance cartouche on a cassone, 16th century, most probably walnut, Villa medicea di Cerreto Guidi, Cerreto Guidi, Italy

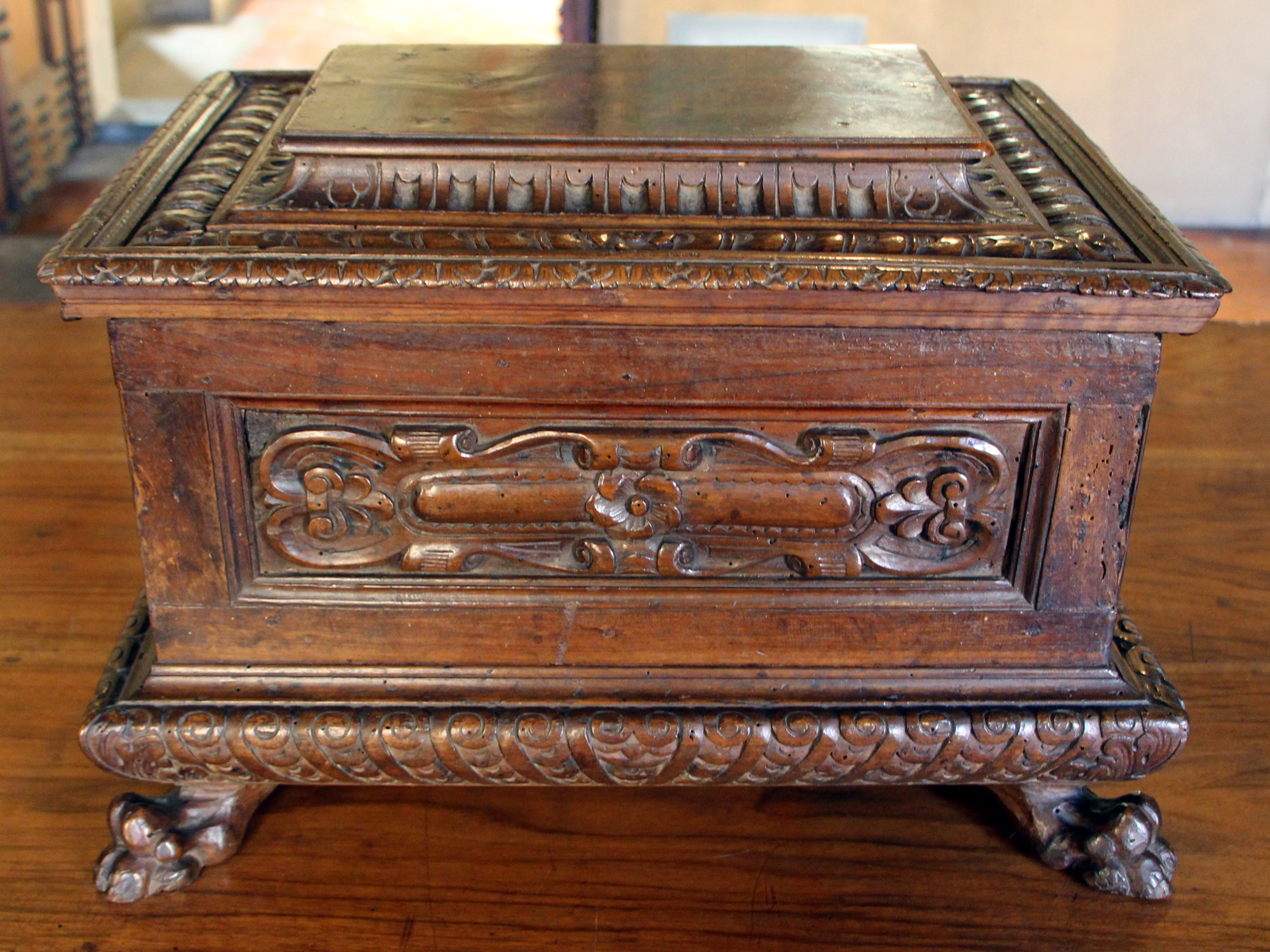
Renaissance cartouche on a chest, 16th century, walnut, Palazzo Davanzati, Florence, Italy

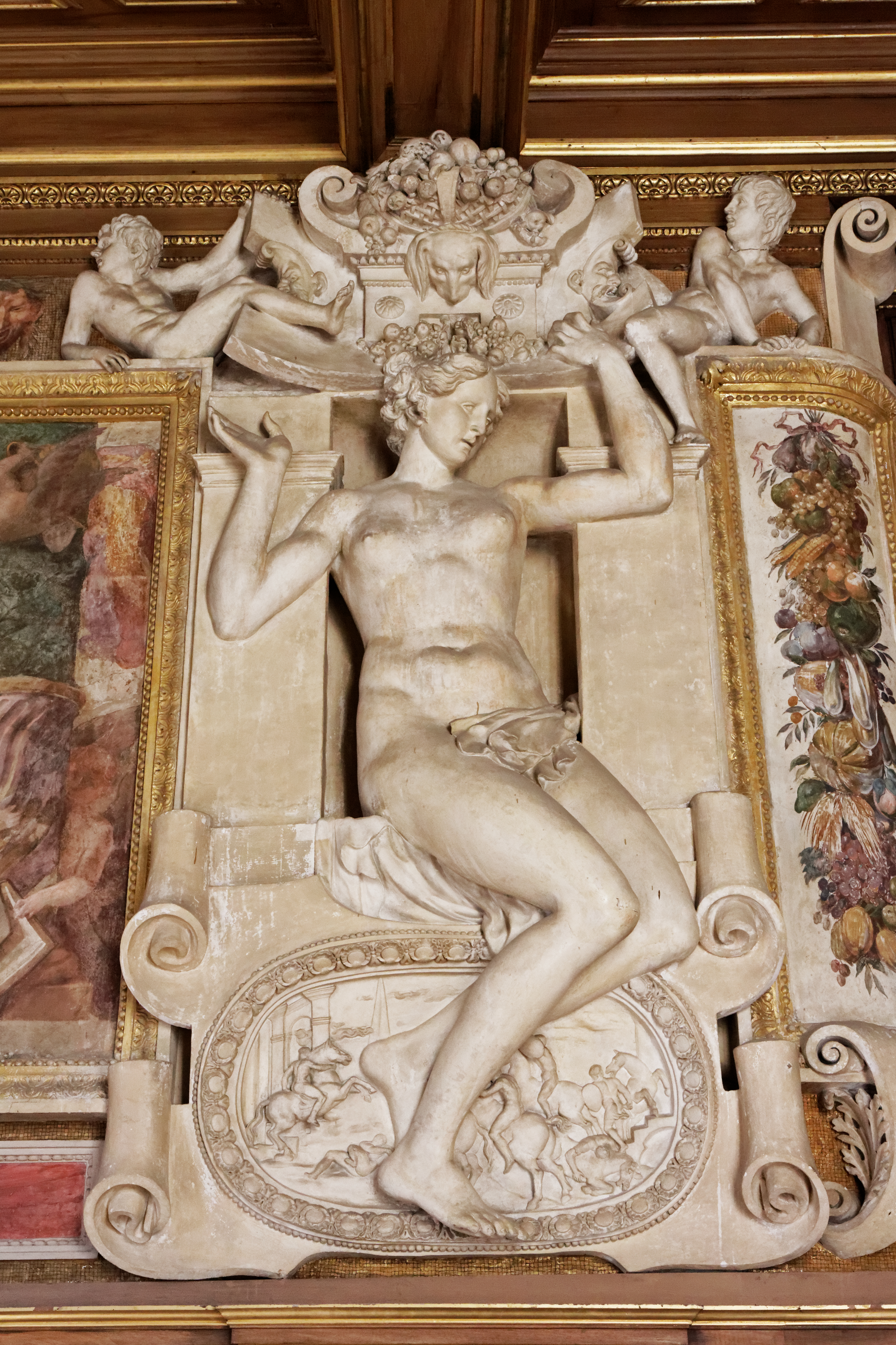
Renaissance stucco cartouche on a wall in the Gallery of Francis I, Palace of Fontainebleau, Fontainebleau, France, by Rosso Fiorentino, designed in 1532

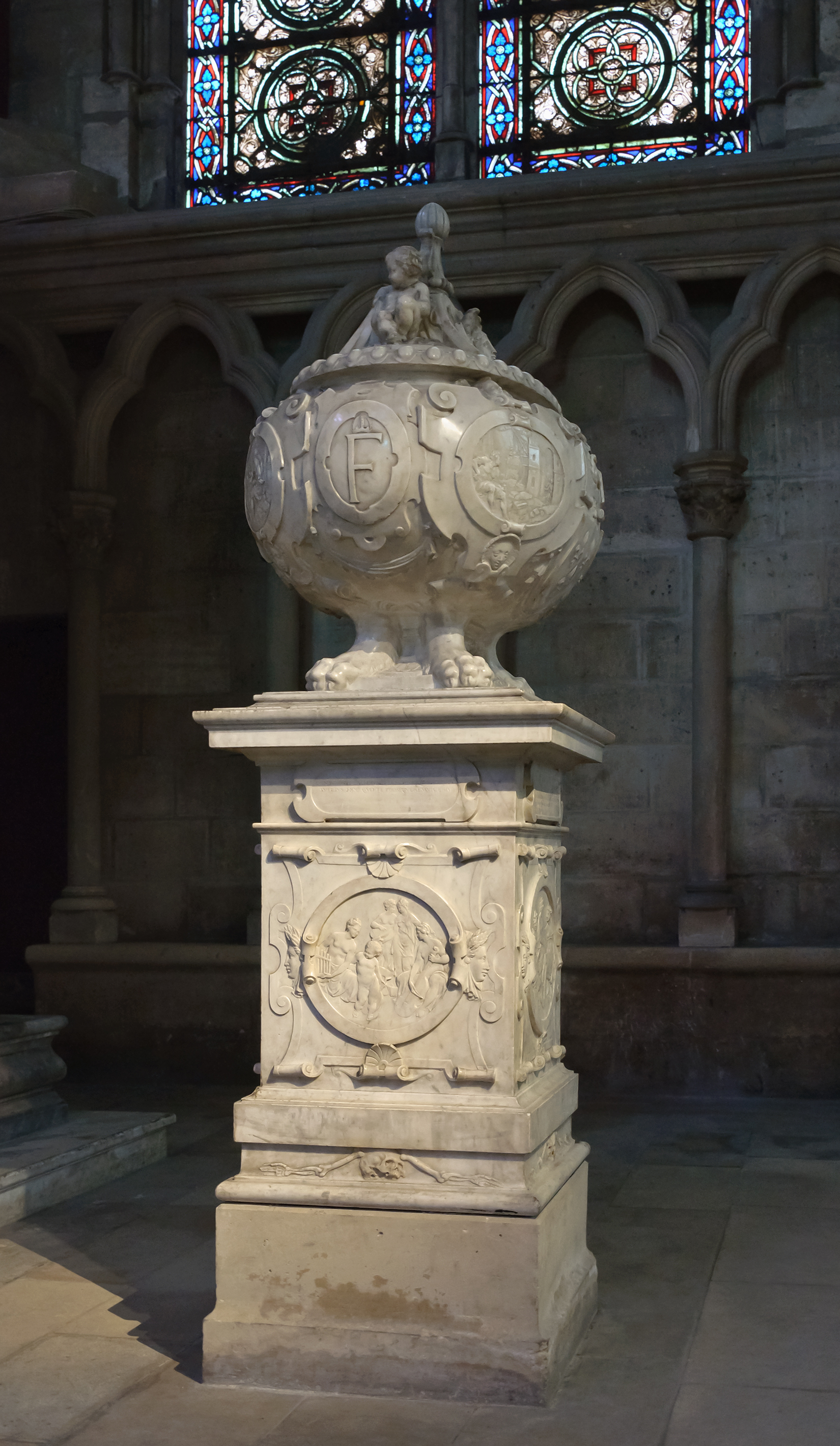
Renaissance cartouches on the Monument for the heart of Francis I, Basilica of Saint-Denis, Saint-Denis, France, by Pierre Bontemps, 1556

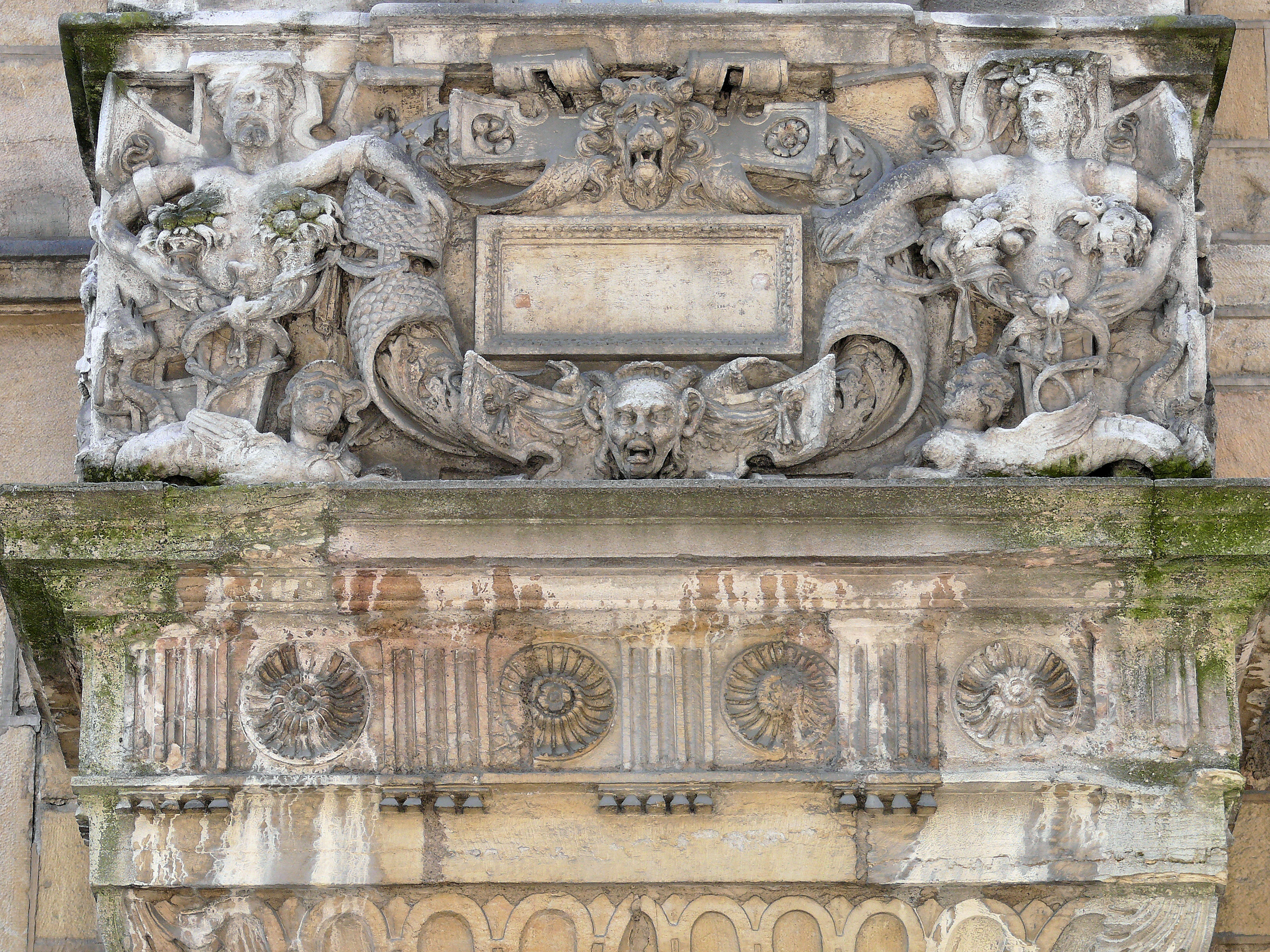
Renaissance cartouche on the Hôtel Bénigne Le Compasseur (Rue Vannerie no. 64), Dijon, France, unknown architect, 1570

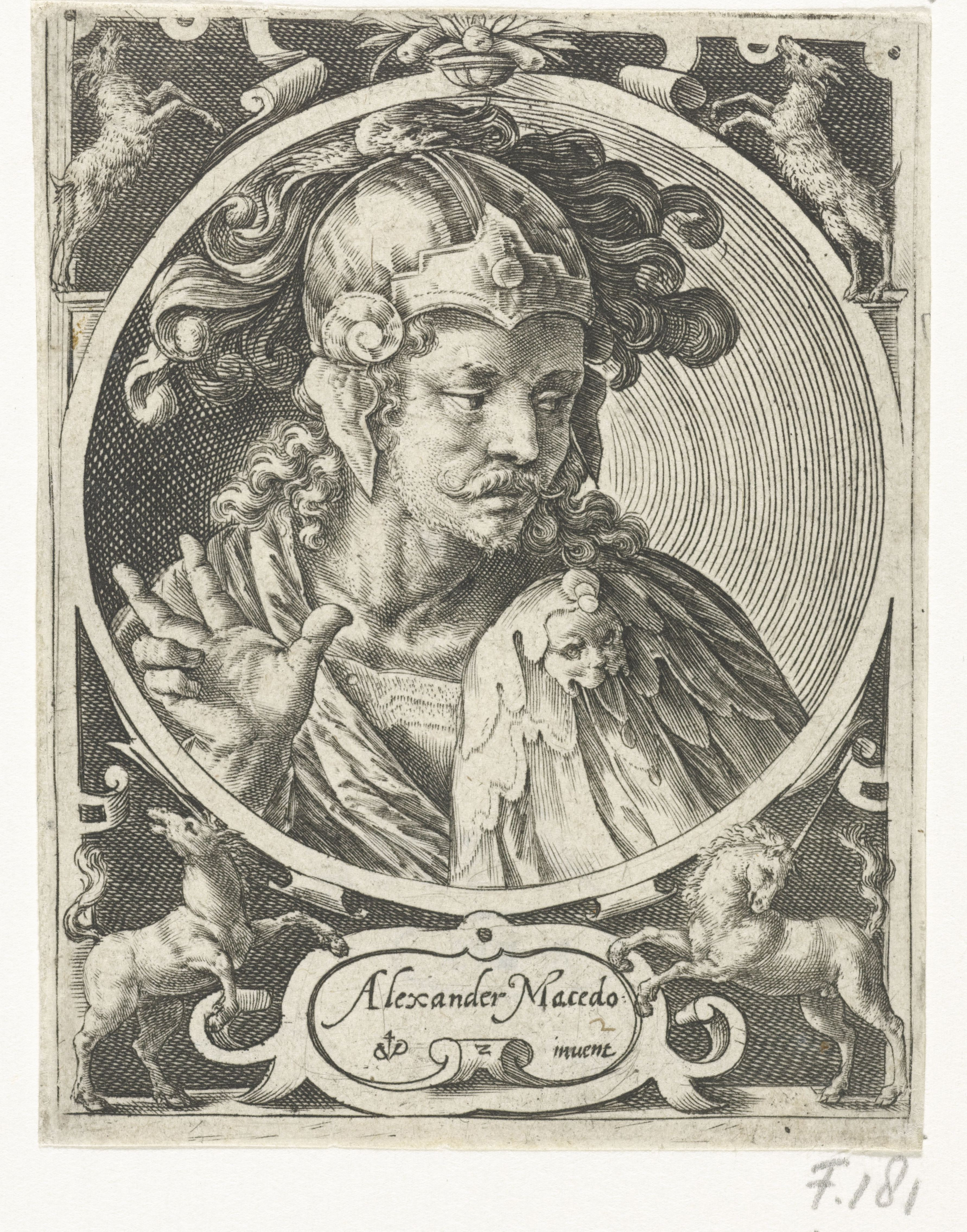
Two Renaissance cartouches, a big one with Alexander the Great and a smaller one with an inscription, by Crispijn van de Passe the Elder, 1574-1637, engraving on paper, Rijksmuseum, Amsterdam, the Netherlands

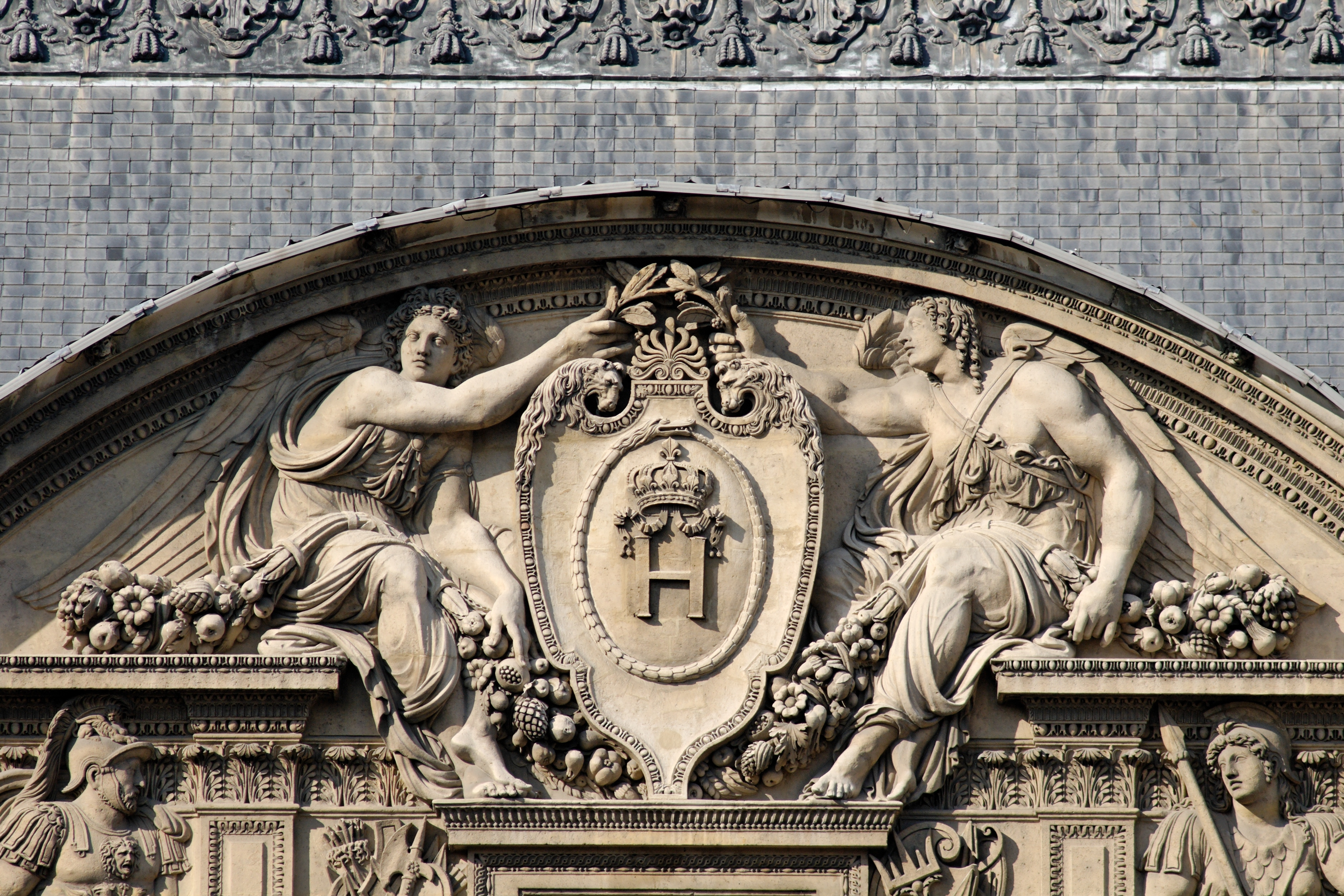
Renaissance cartouche in a pediment of the west facade of the Cour Carrée of the Louvre Palace, Paris, designed by Pierre Lescot, 16th century

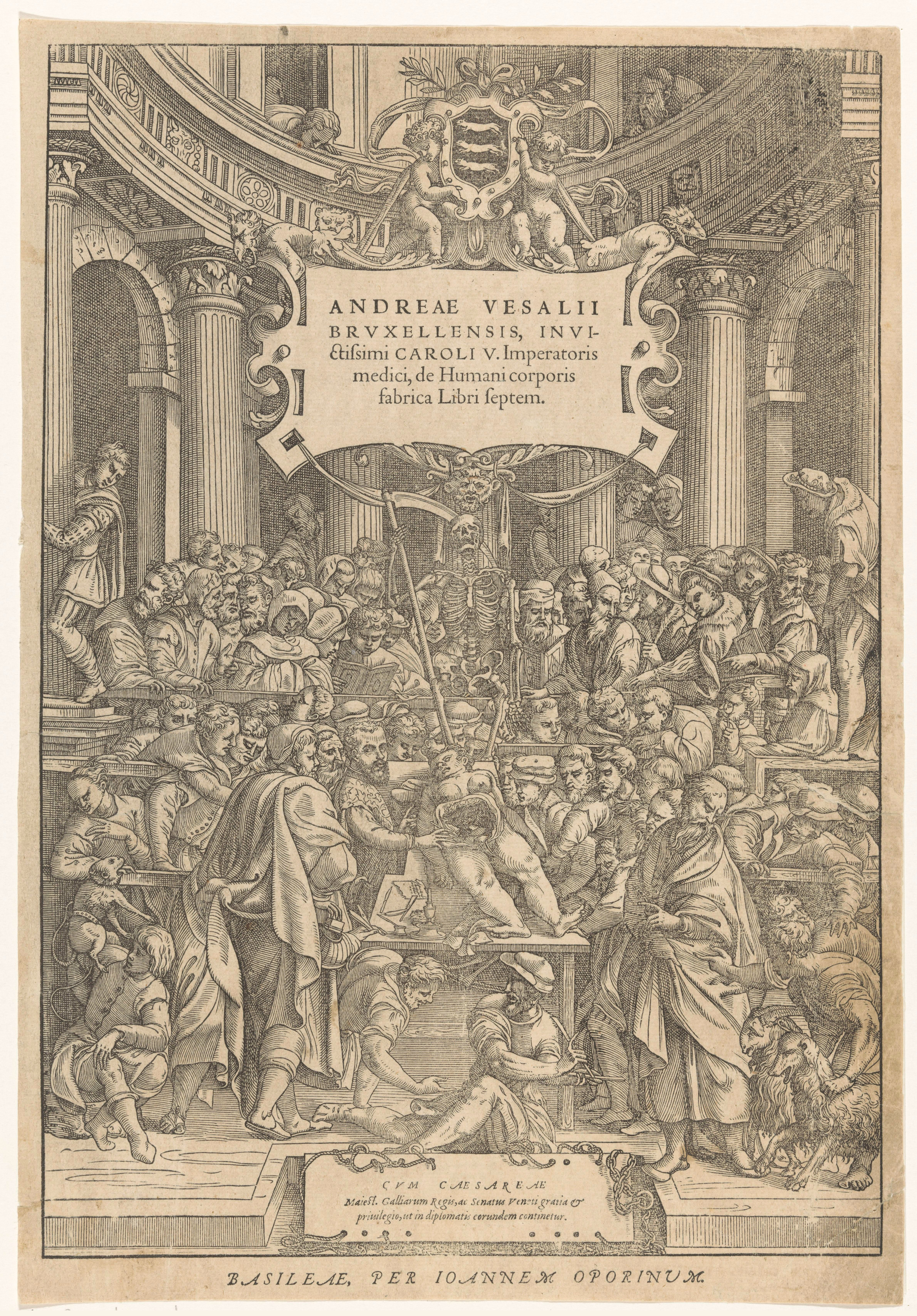
Three Renaissance cartouches (two at the top and one at the bottom) on the frontispiece from On The Fabric of the Human Body, by Andreas Vesalius, 1555, woodcut on paper, Rijksmuseum

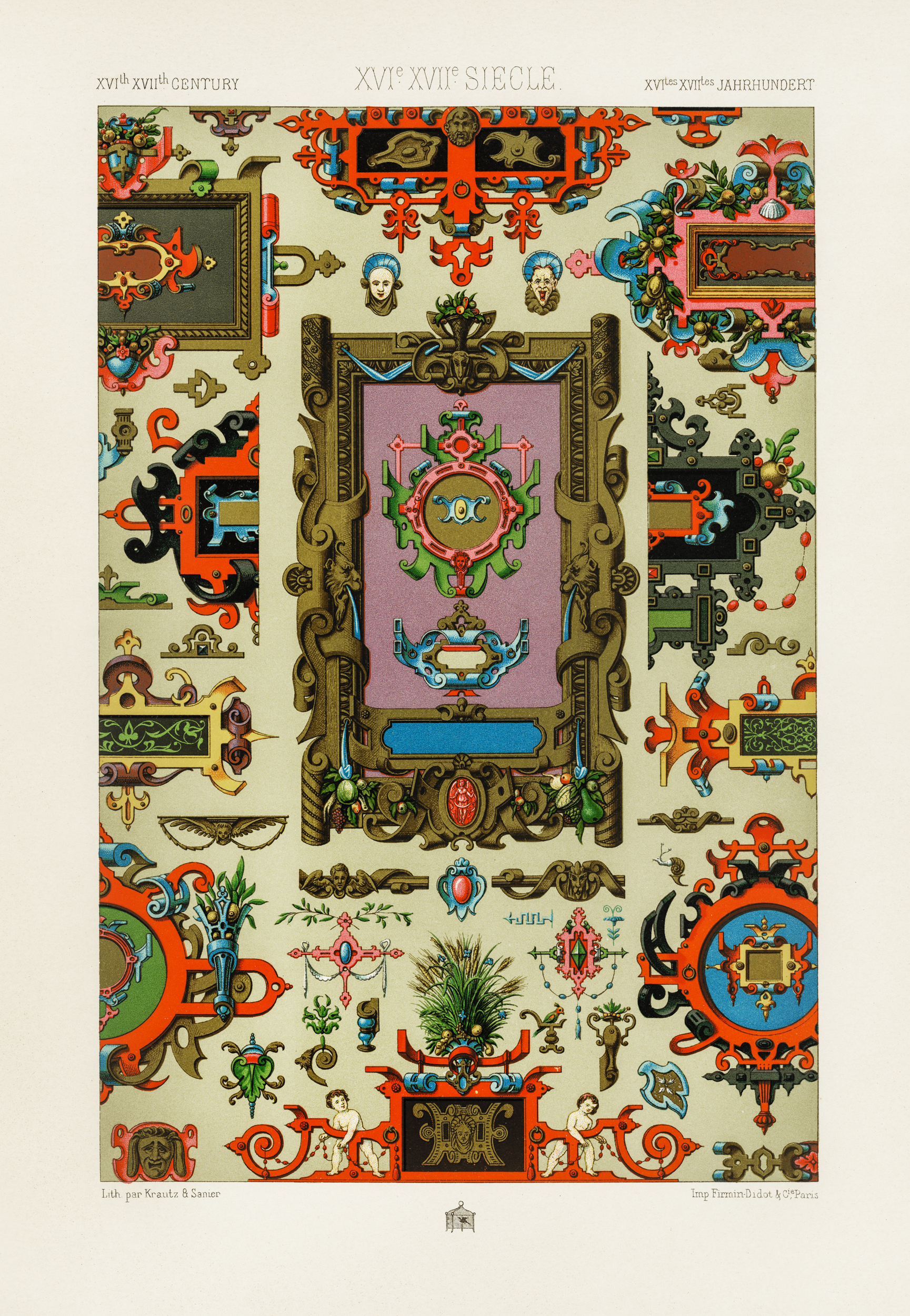
16th and 17th century Renaissance cartouches from L'Ornement Polychrome, by Albert Racinet, 1888

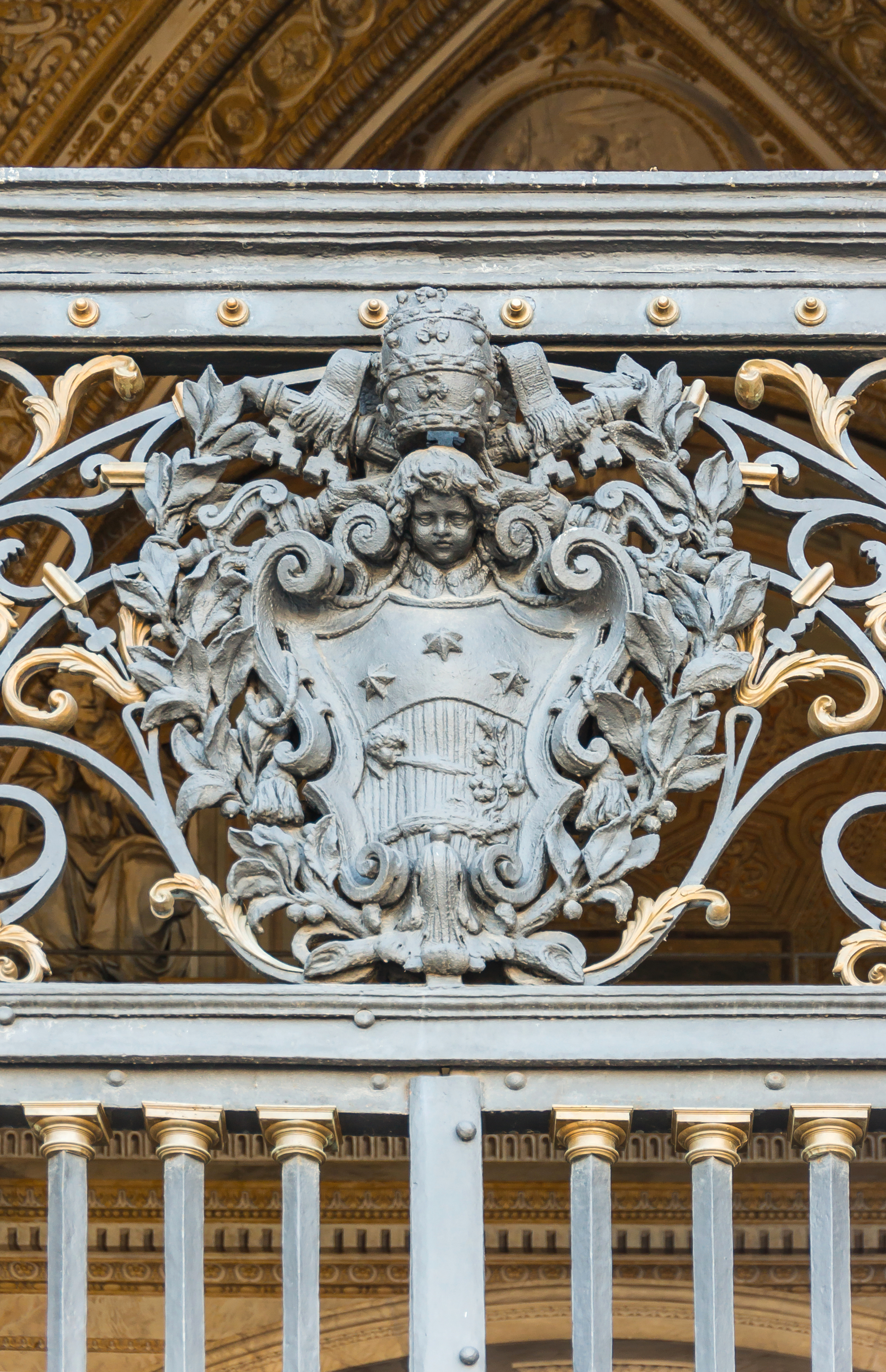
Baroque cartouche at the entrance of St. Peter's Basilica, Rome, unknown architect or blacksmith, c.1615

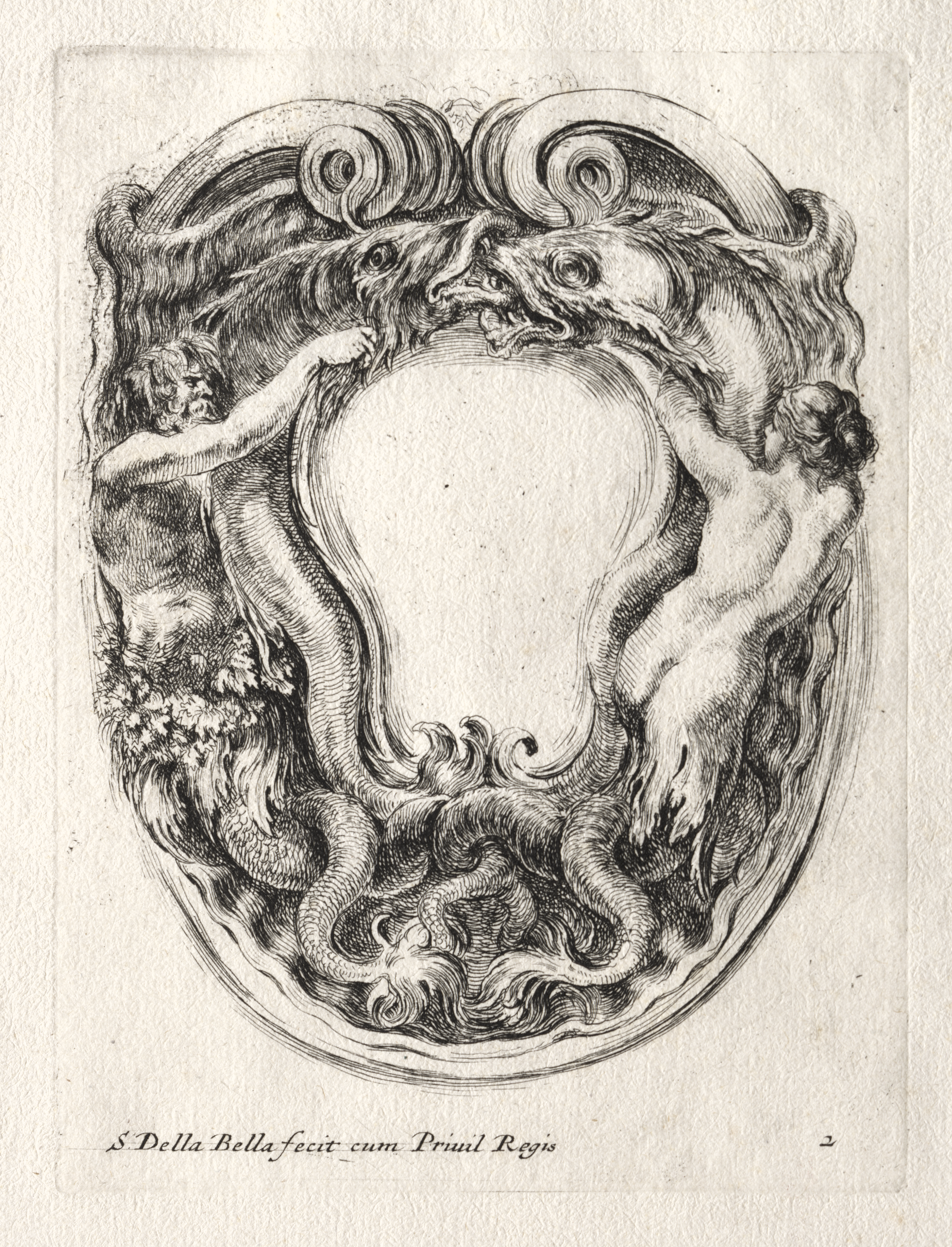
Design of a Baroque cartouche, by Stefano della Bella, 1647, etching on paper, Cleveland Museum of Art, Cleveland, US

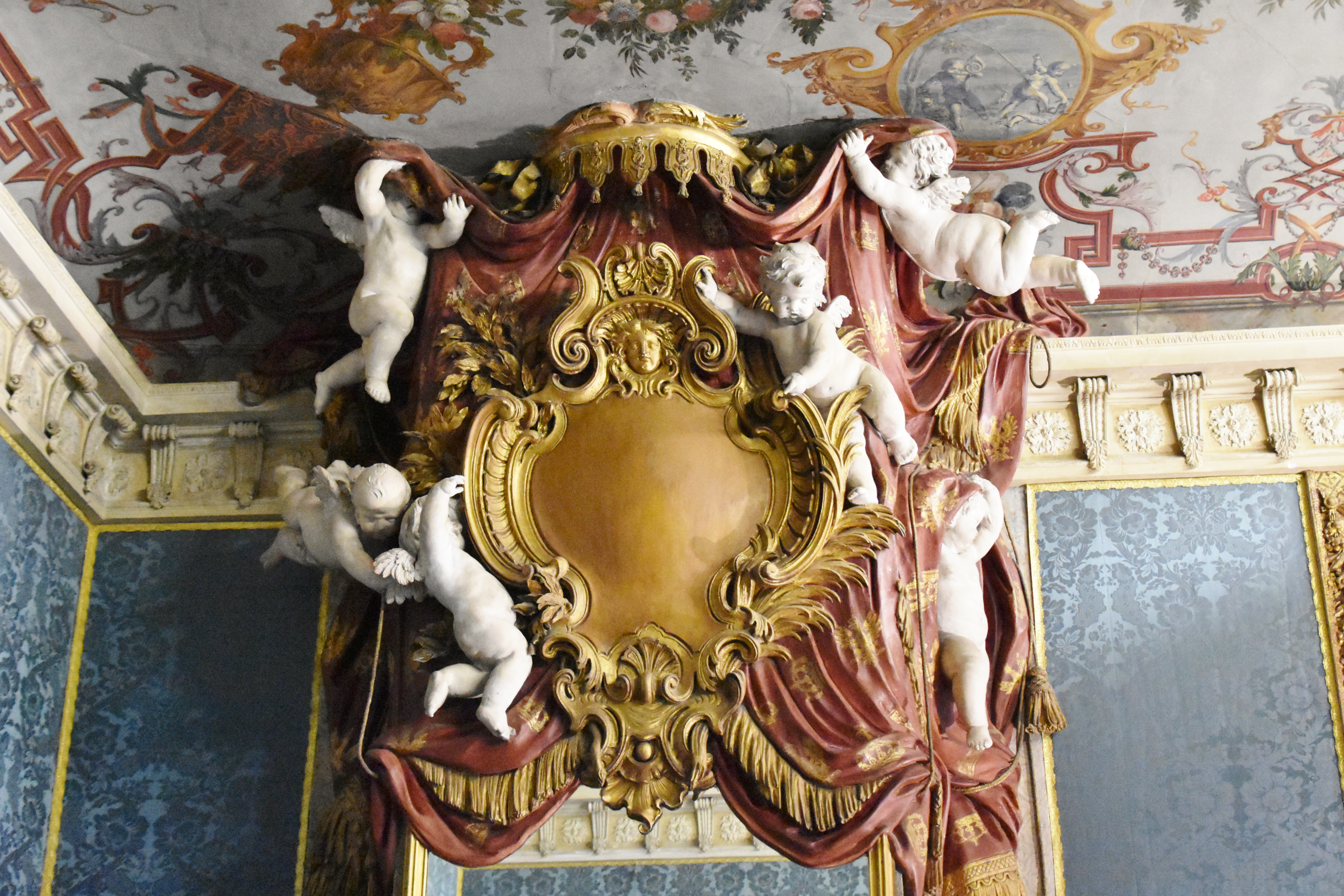
Baroque cartouche with putti, above a mirror in the bedchamber of the Mecklenburg Apartment, Charlottenburg Palace, Berlin, unknown architect, 17th century

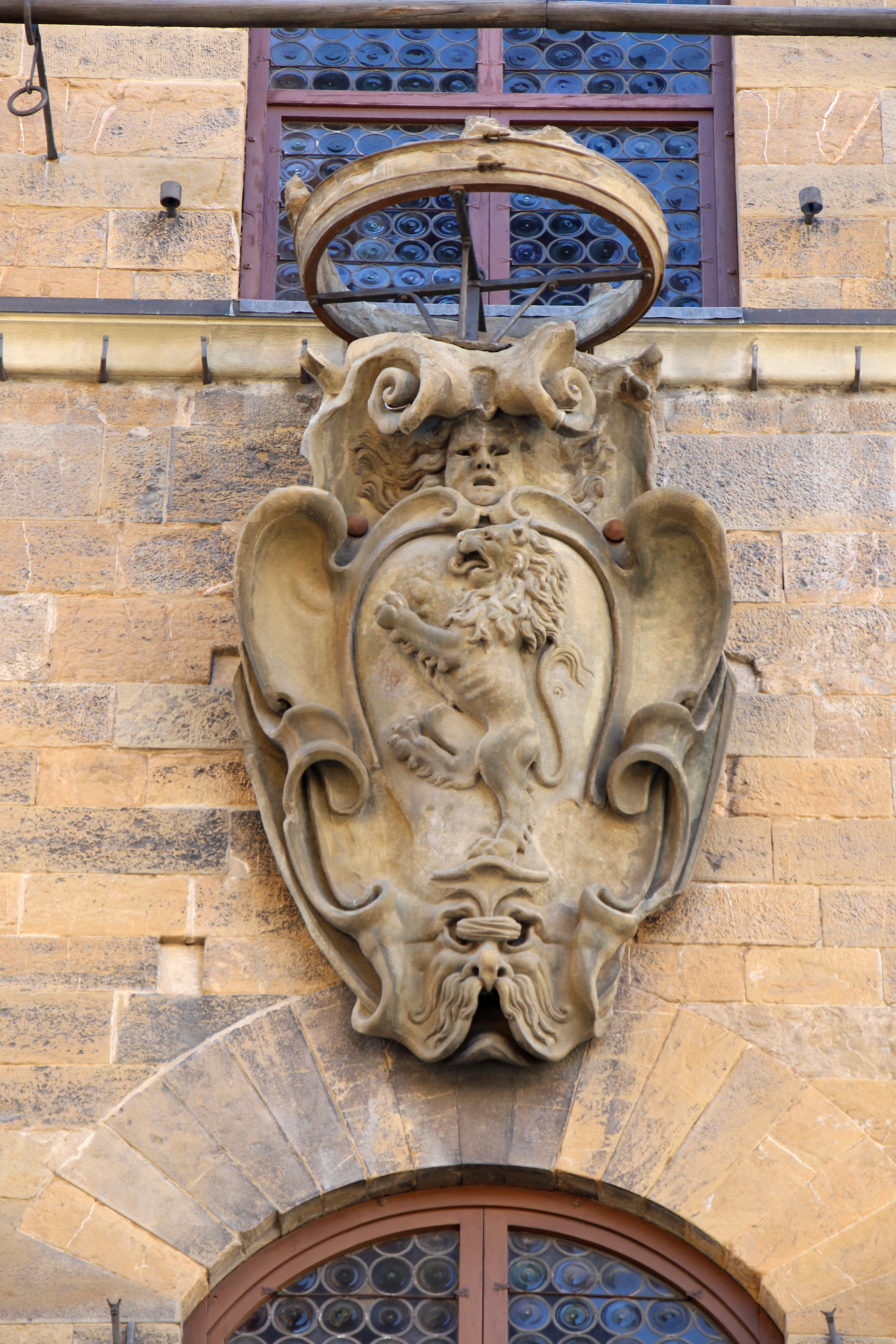
Baroque cartouche with the coat of arms of the Davanzati Family on the Palazzo Davanzati, Florence, unknown sculptor, late 17th century

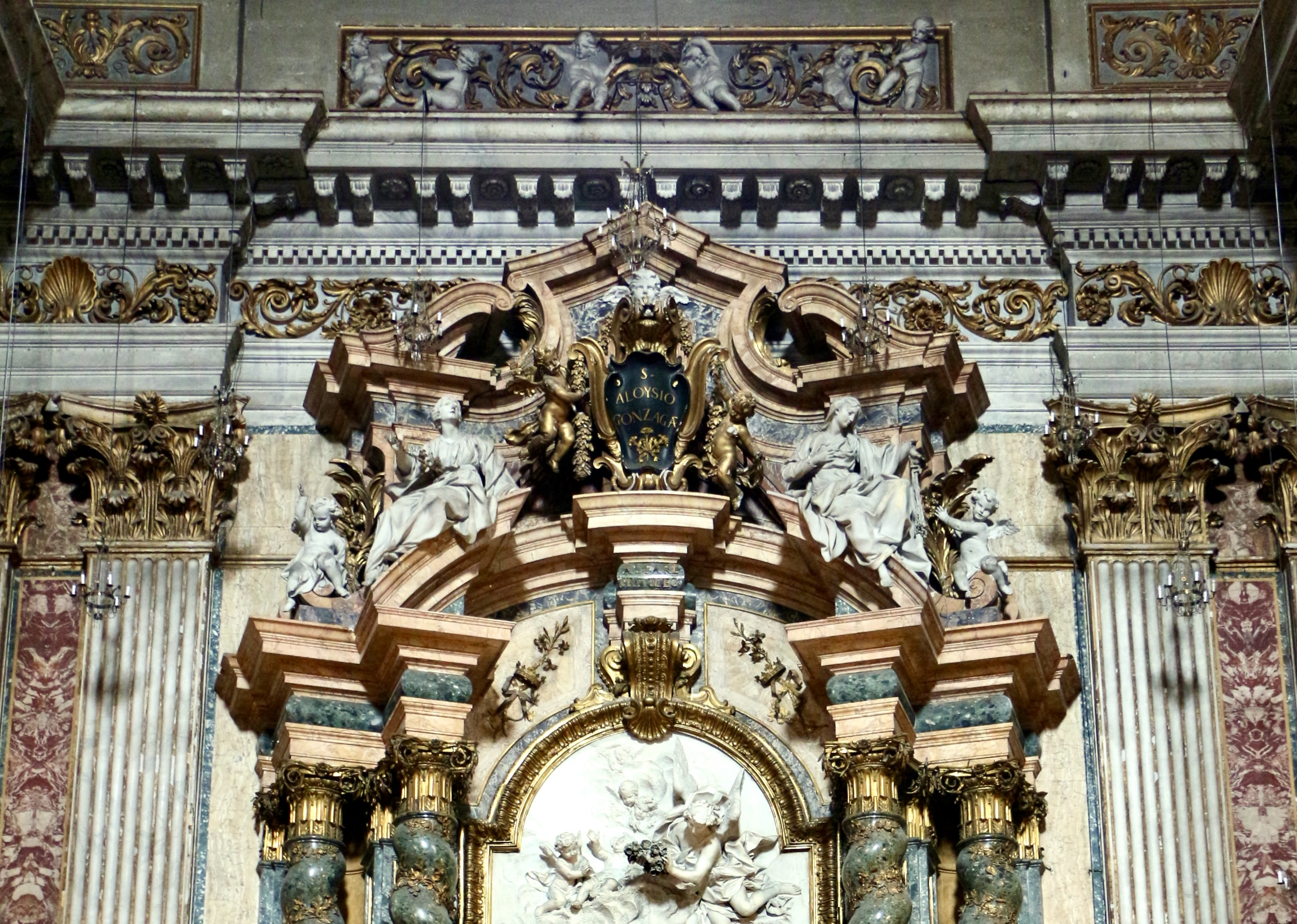
Baroque cartouche and pediments on the Altar of Saint Aloysius Gonzaga, Sant'Ignazio, Rome, by Pierre Le Gros the Younger, 1697-1699

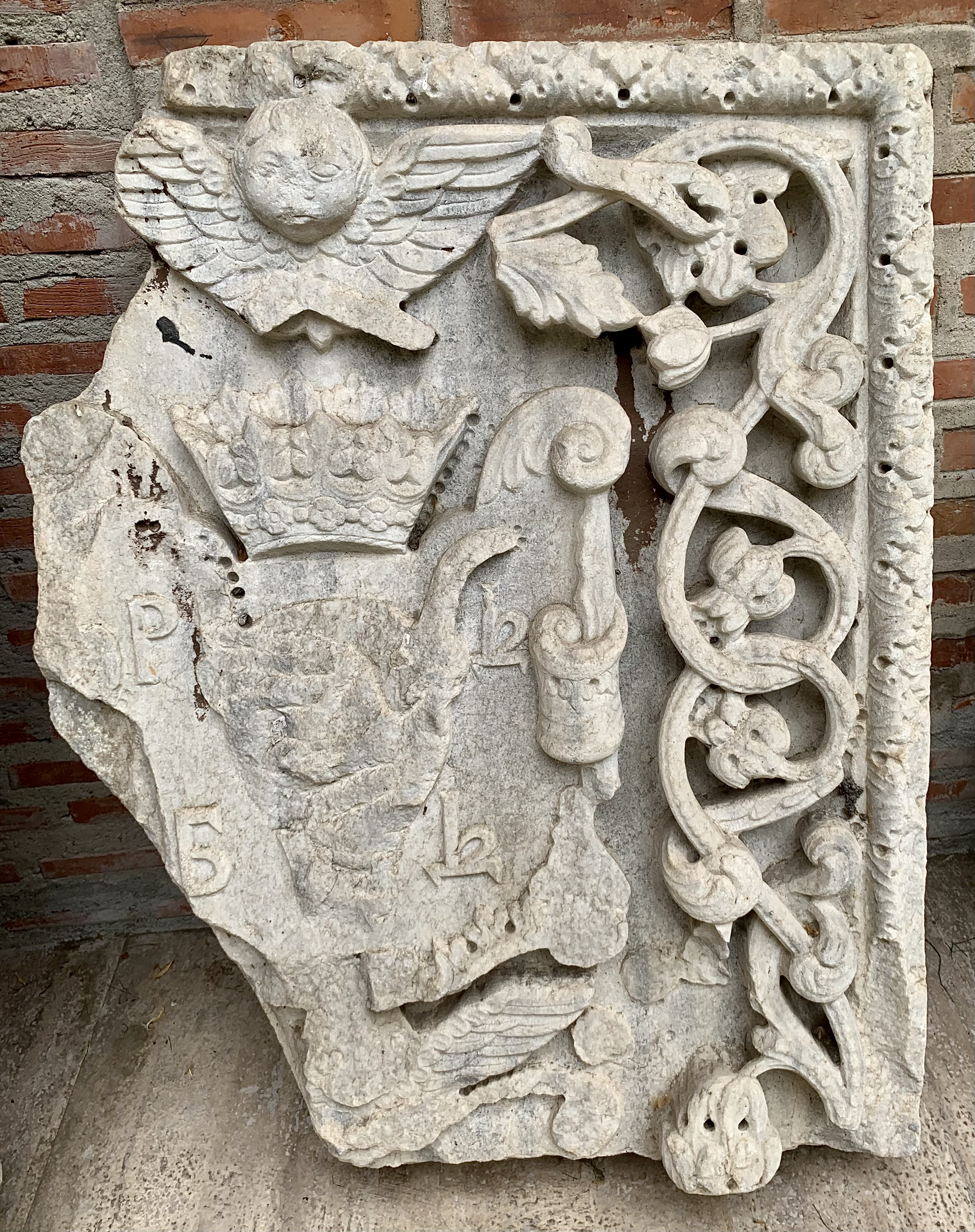
Brâncovenesc cartouche on a damaged stone in the courtyard of Antim Monastery, Bucharest, Romania, unknown sculptor, late 17th-early 18th century

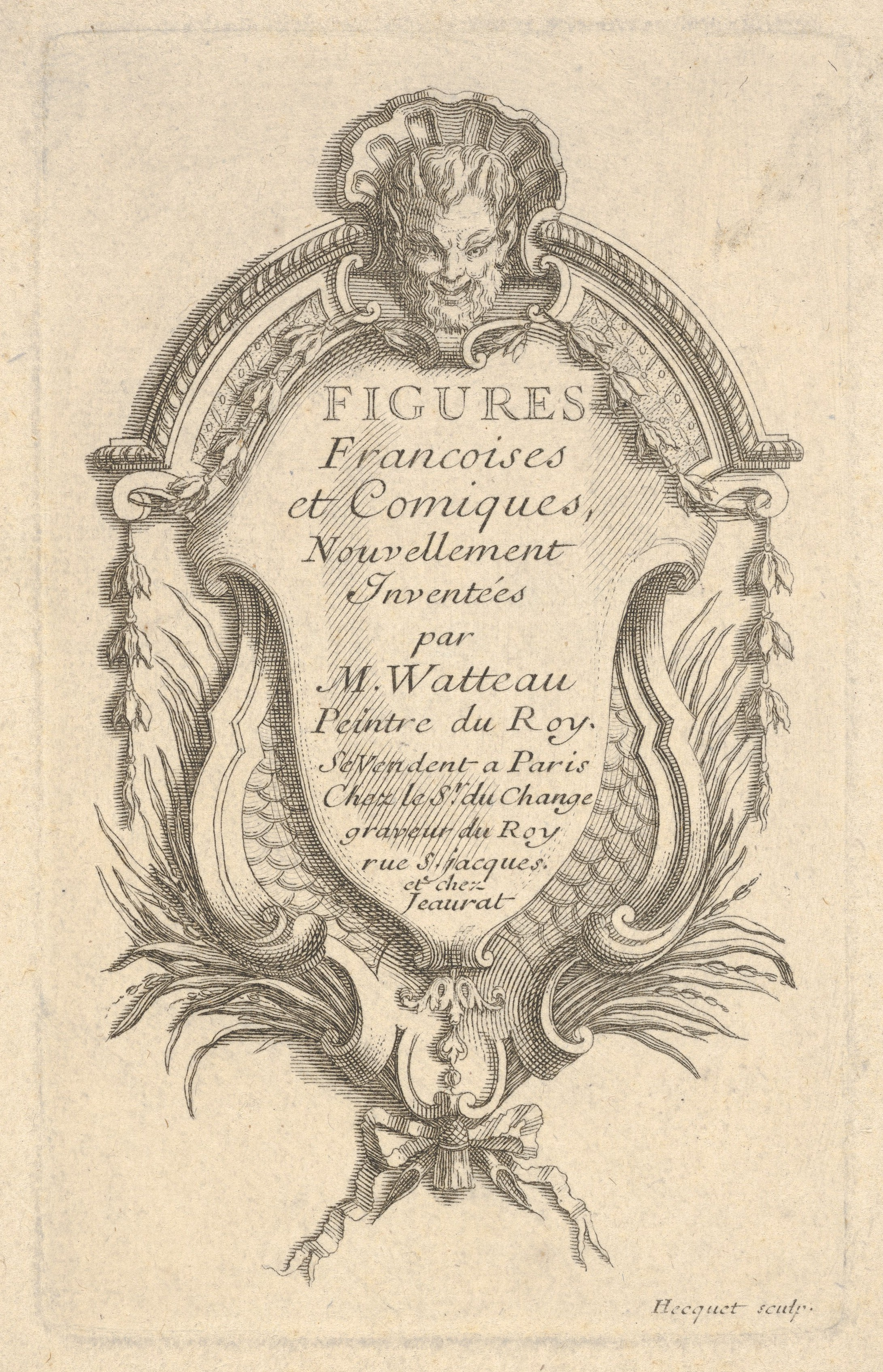
Baroque cartouche of the frontispiece for Figures françoises et comiques by Robert Hecquet, possibly 1702, etching in paper, Metropolitan Museum of Art, New York City

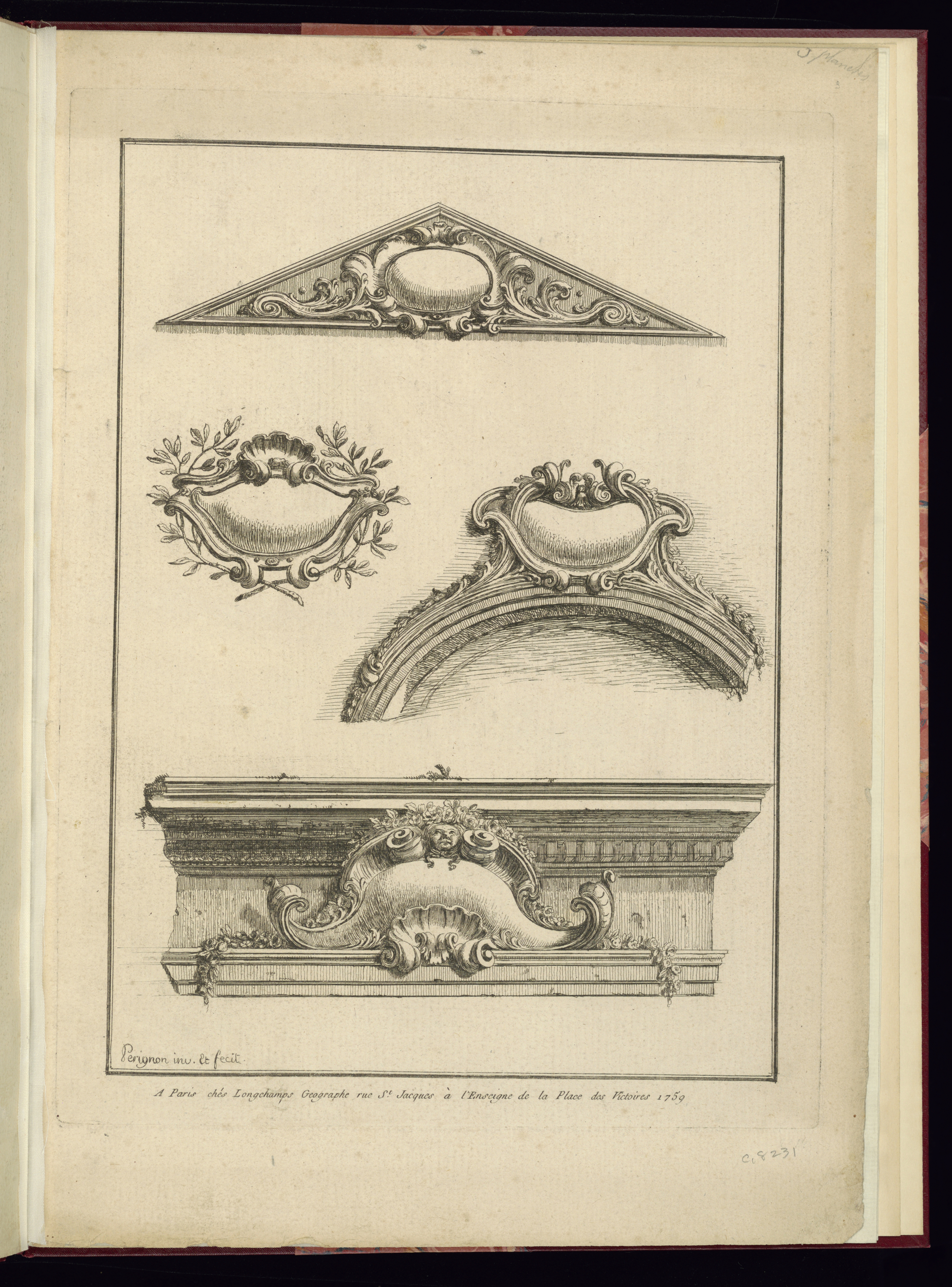
Baroque cartouche, unknown date, etching on paper, Cooper Hewitt, Smithsonian Design Museum, New York

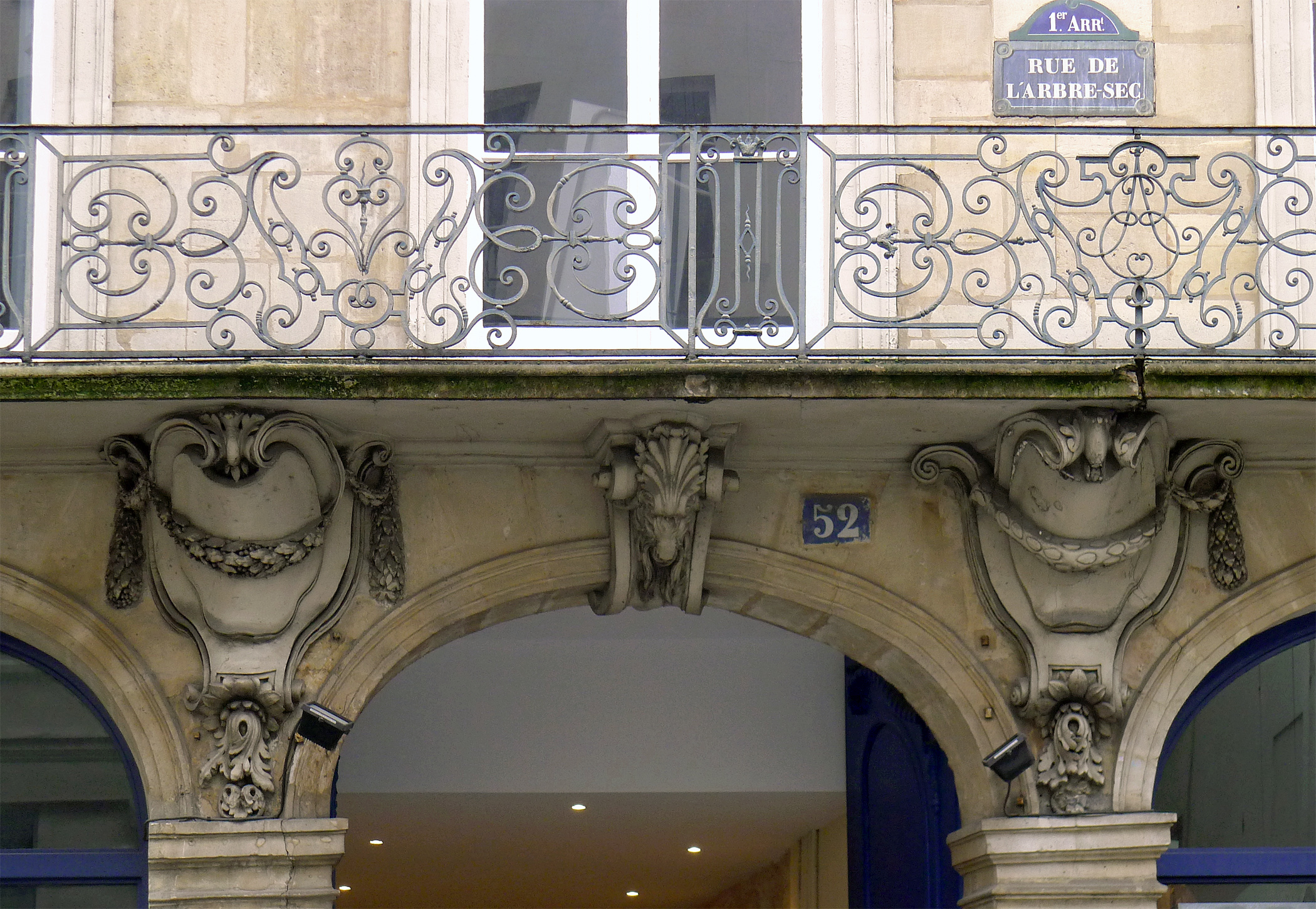
Baroque cartouche-shaped corbels on the facade of the Hôtel d'Eynaud (Rue de l'Arbre-Sec no, 52), Paris, unknown architect, 1721

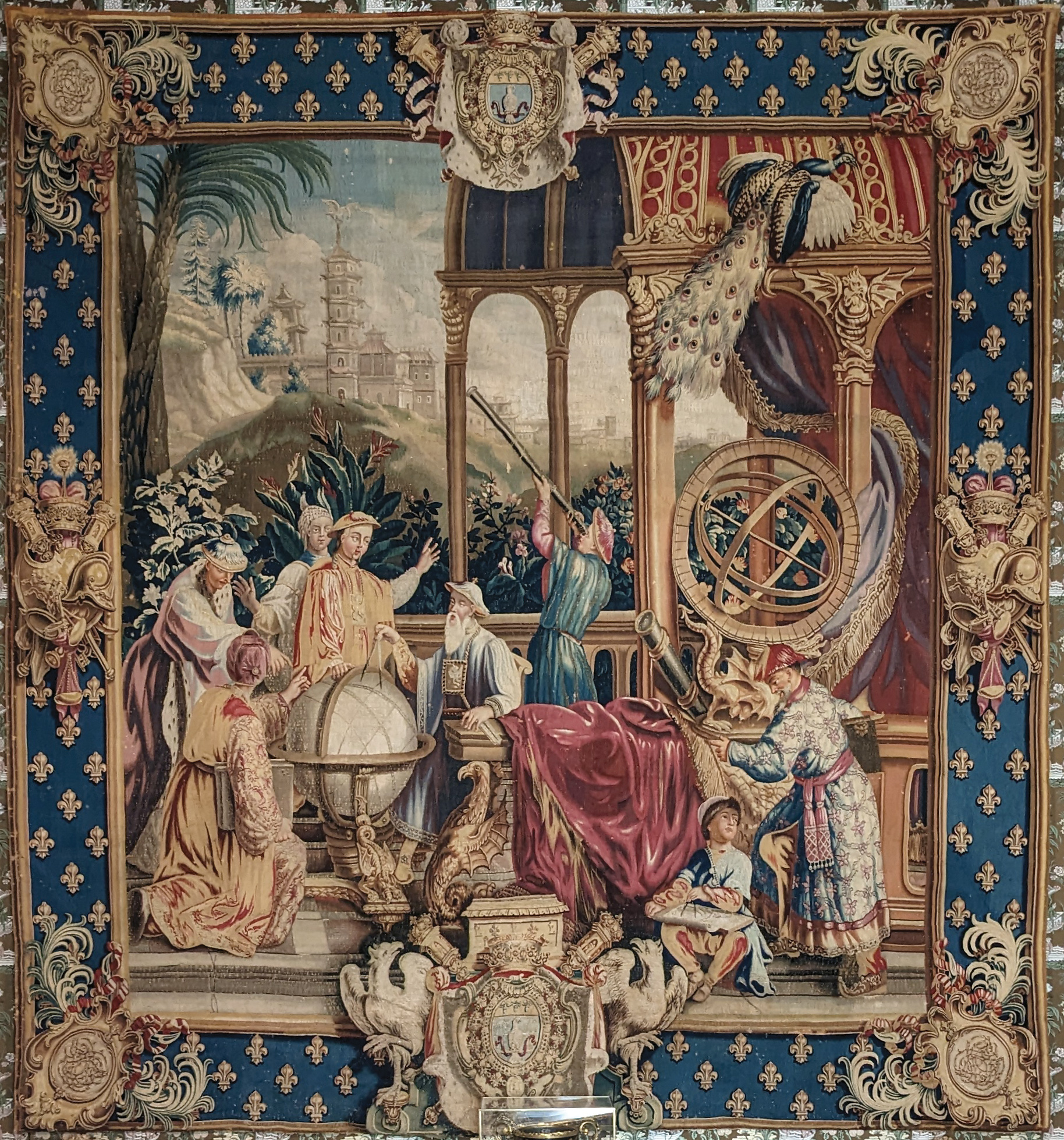
Baroque cartouche on the edges and corners of The Astronomers, designed by Guy-Louis Vernansal, 1722-1724, wool, silk and tapestry weaving, Louvre

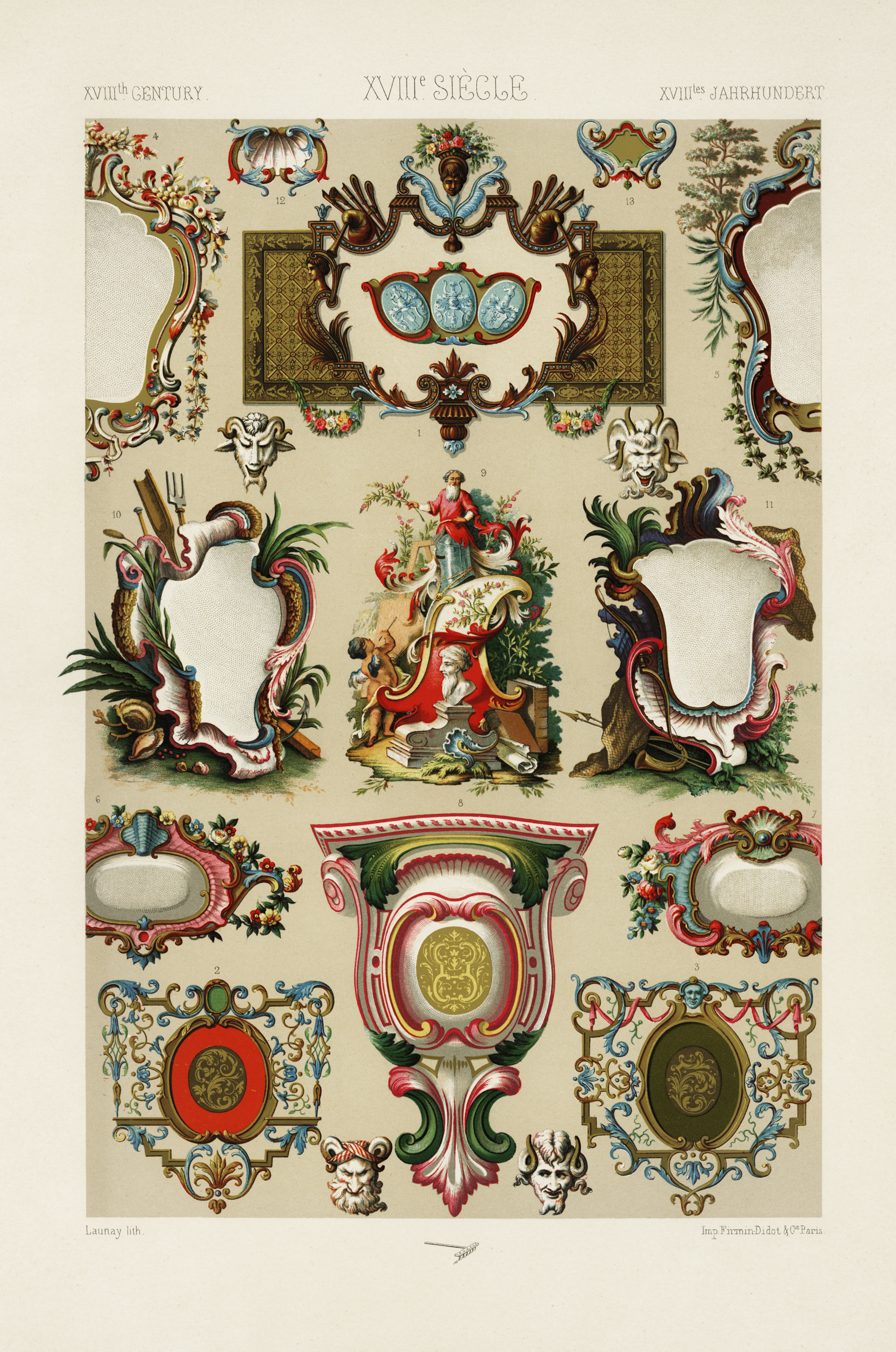
18th century Rococo cartouches from L'Ornement Polychrome, by Albert Racinet, 1888

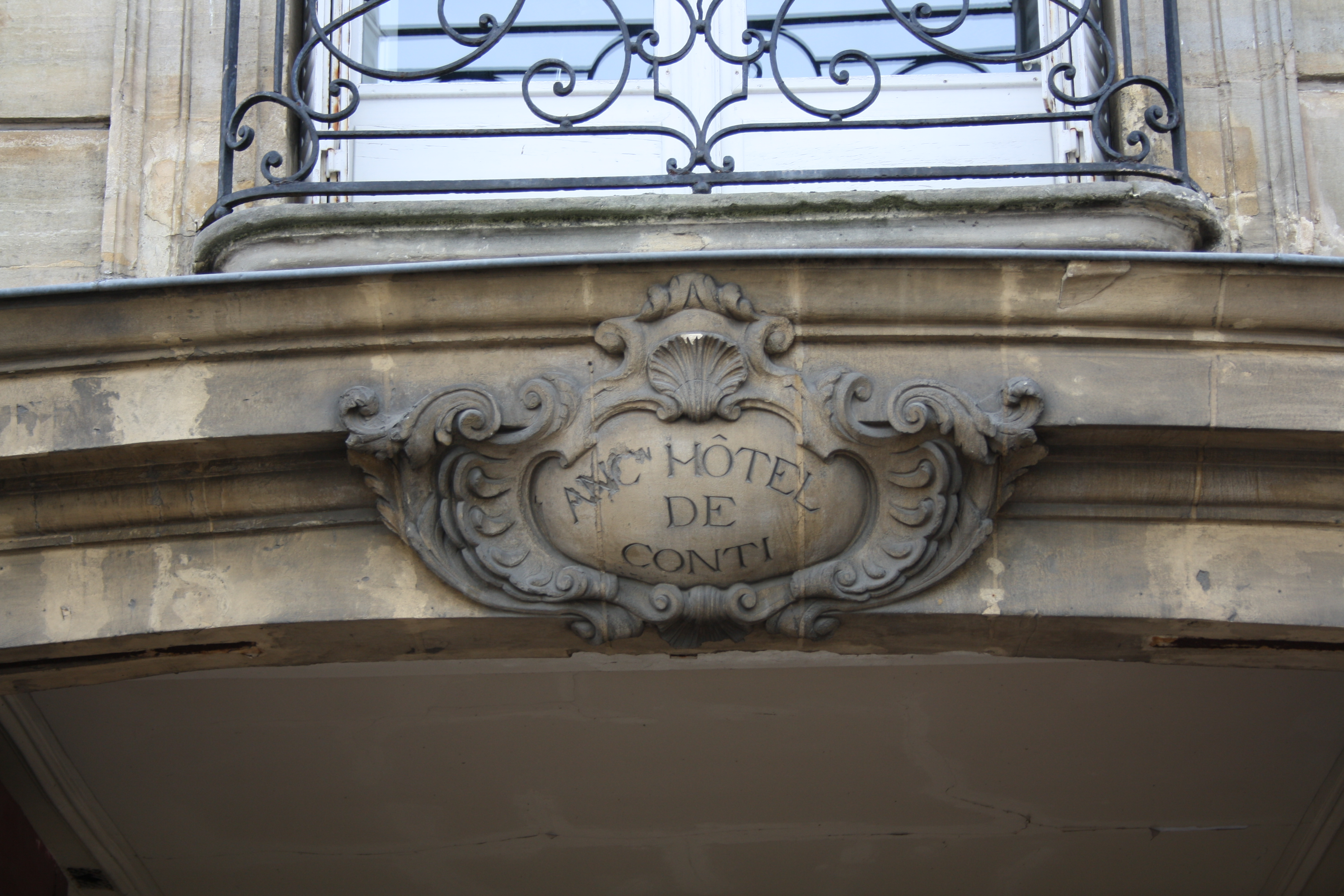
Rococo cartouche of the Hôtel de Conti (Place du Château no. 14), Saint-Germain-en-Laye, France, unknown architect, 18th century

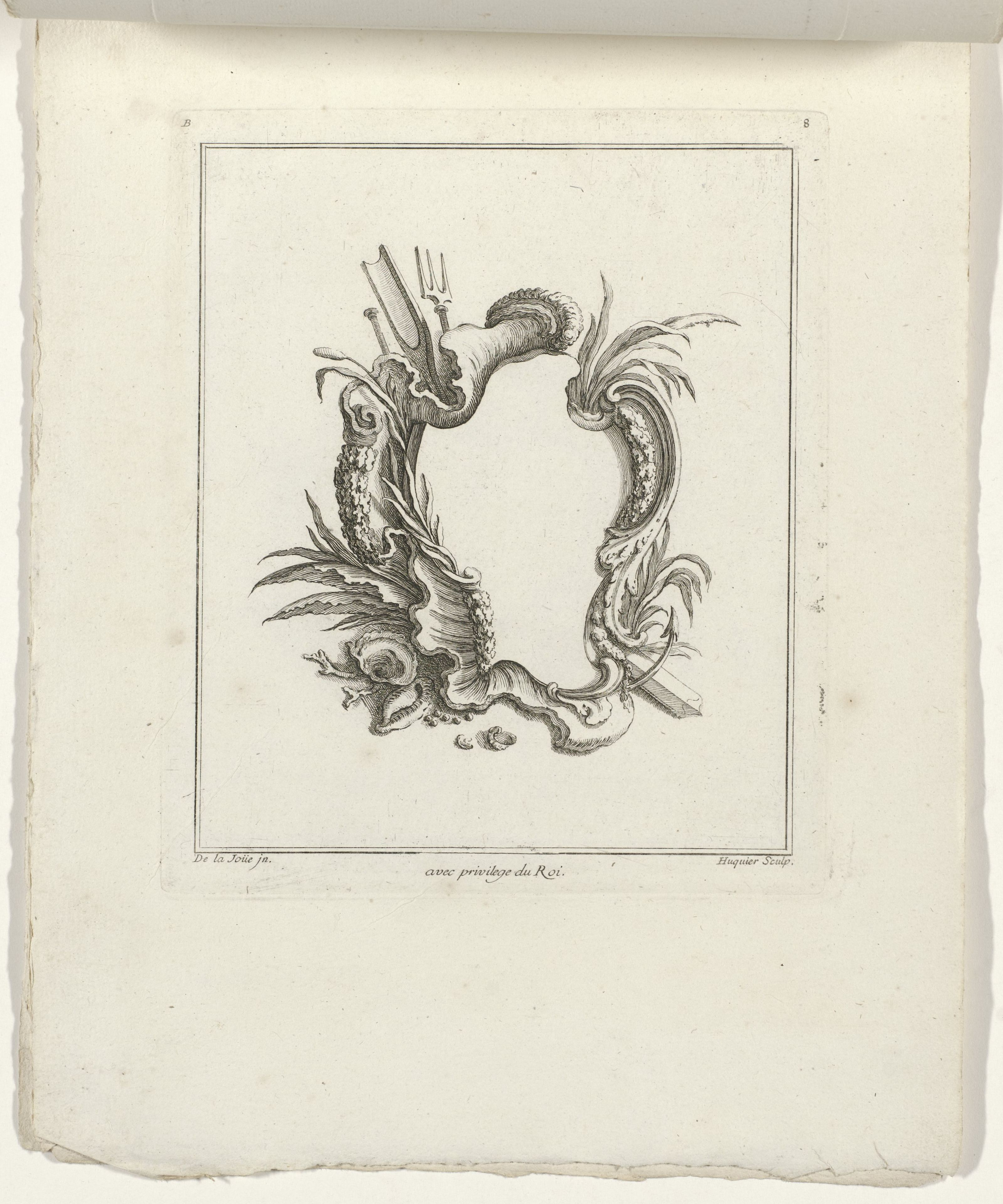
Rococo cartouche from the Second Livre de Cartouches, c.1710–1772, Rijksmuseum

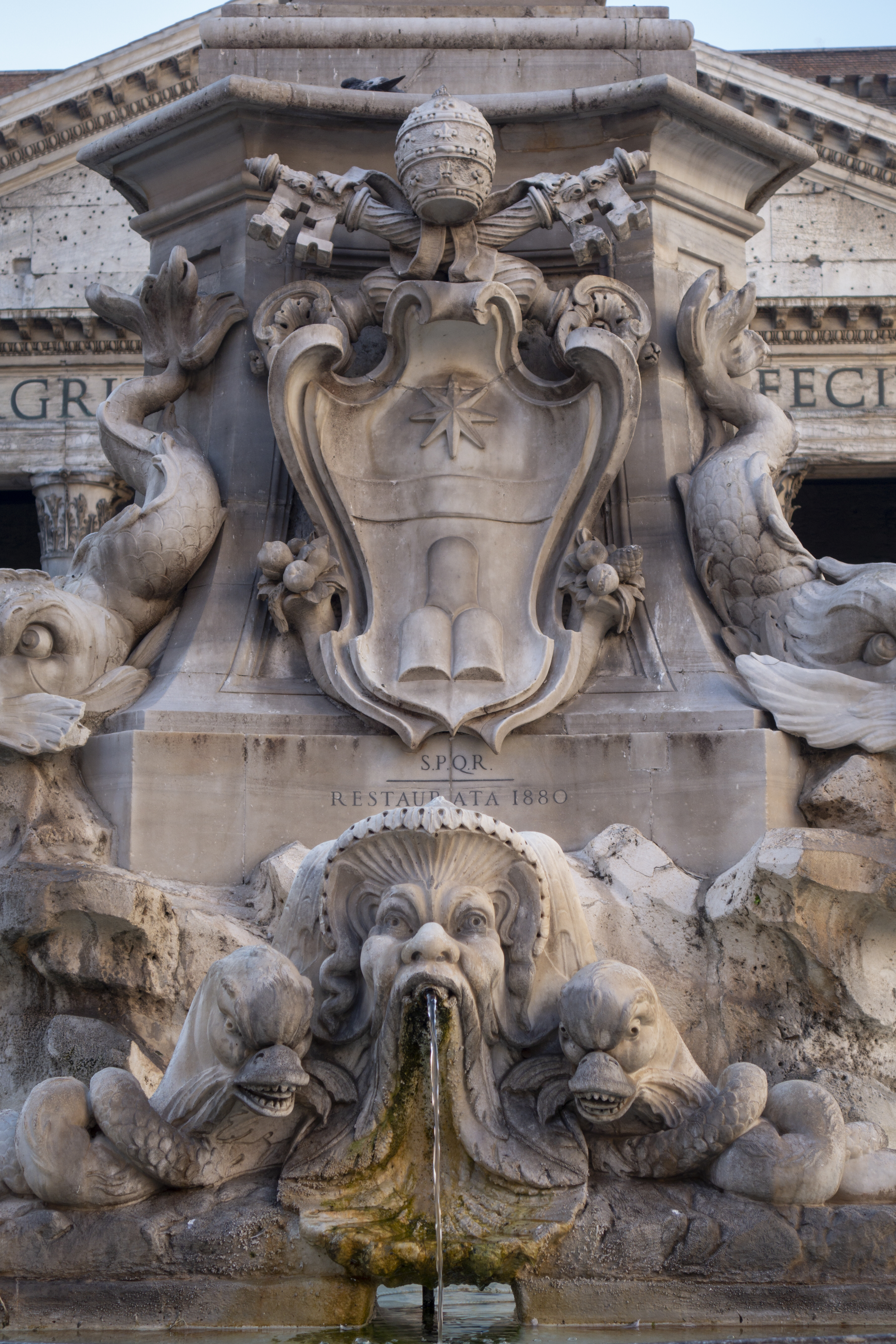
Baroque cartouche on the Fontana del Pantheon, Rome, by Filippo Barigioni, 1711

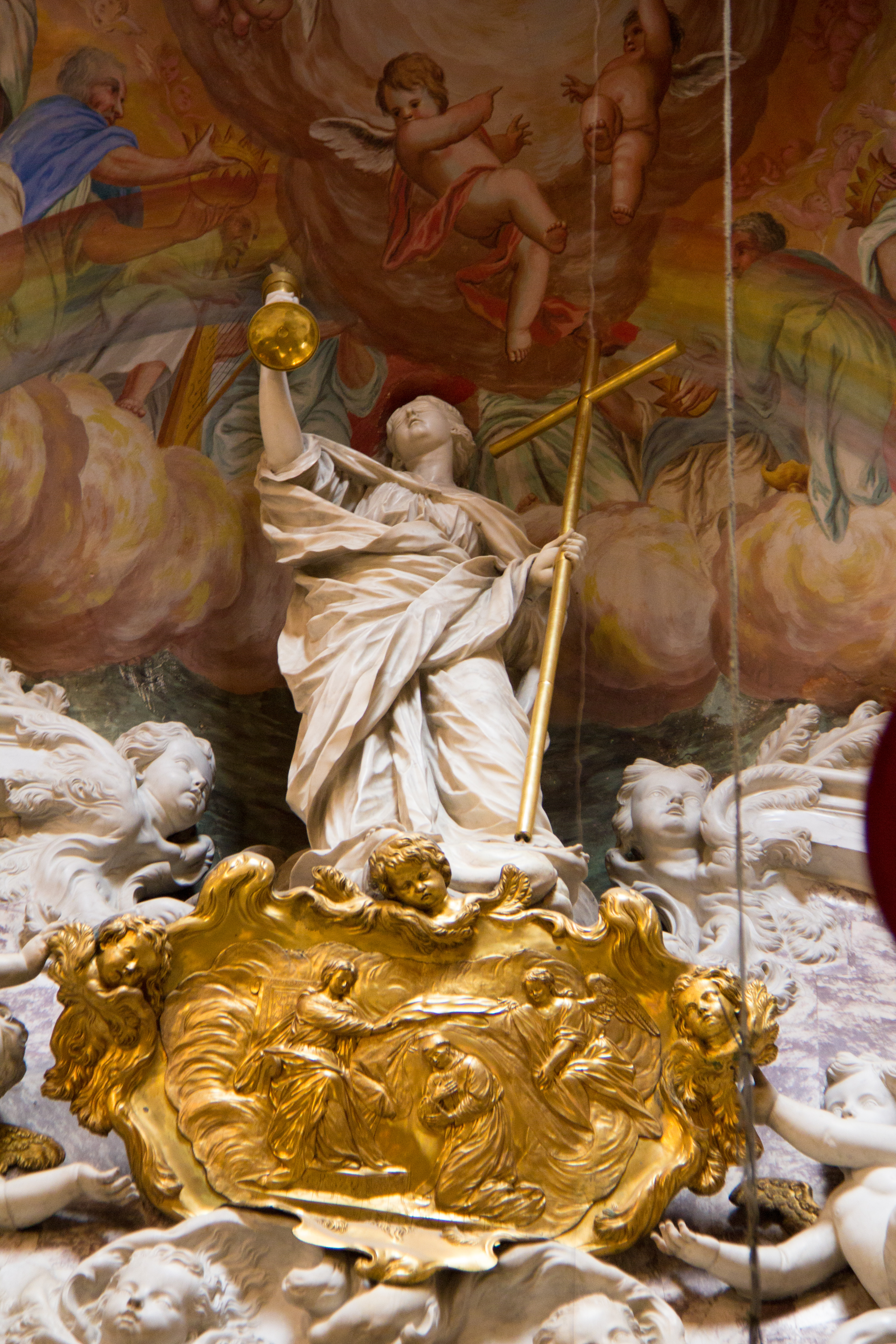
Baroque cartouche of the El Transparente altarpiece, Toledo Cathedral, Toledo, Spain, designed and made by Narciso Tomé, 1729-1732

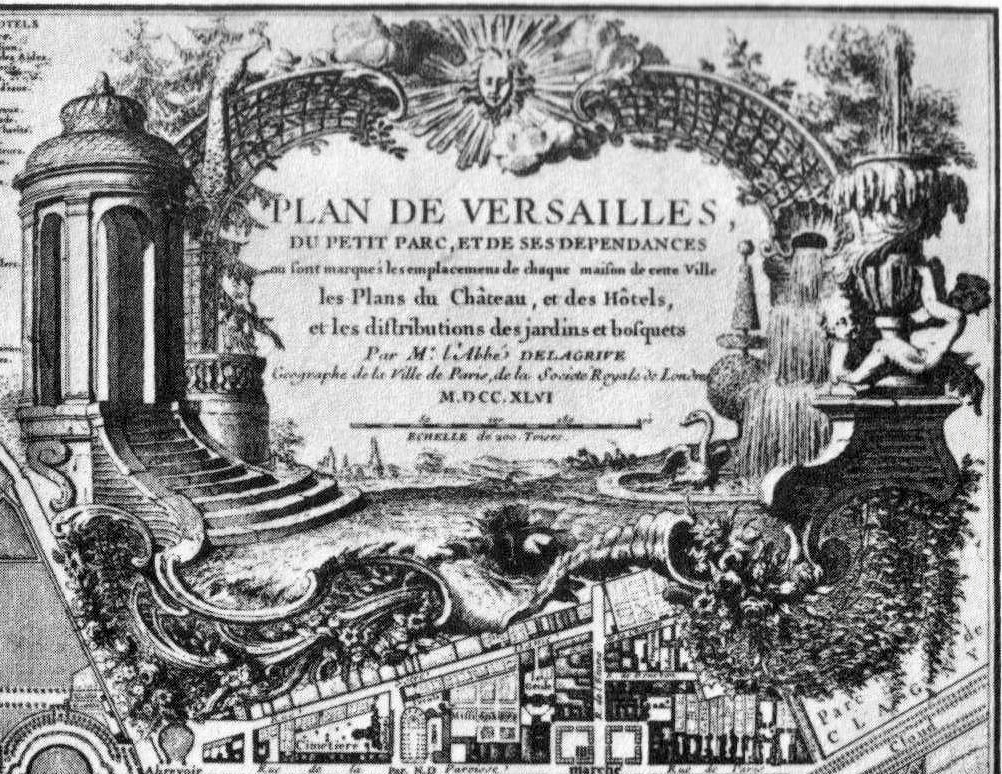
Rococo cartouche in the corner of a Versailles plan, by Jean Delagrive, 1746, engraving on paper, Bibliothèque nationale de France, Paris

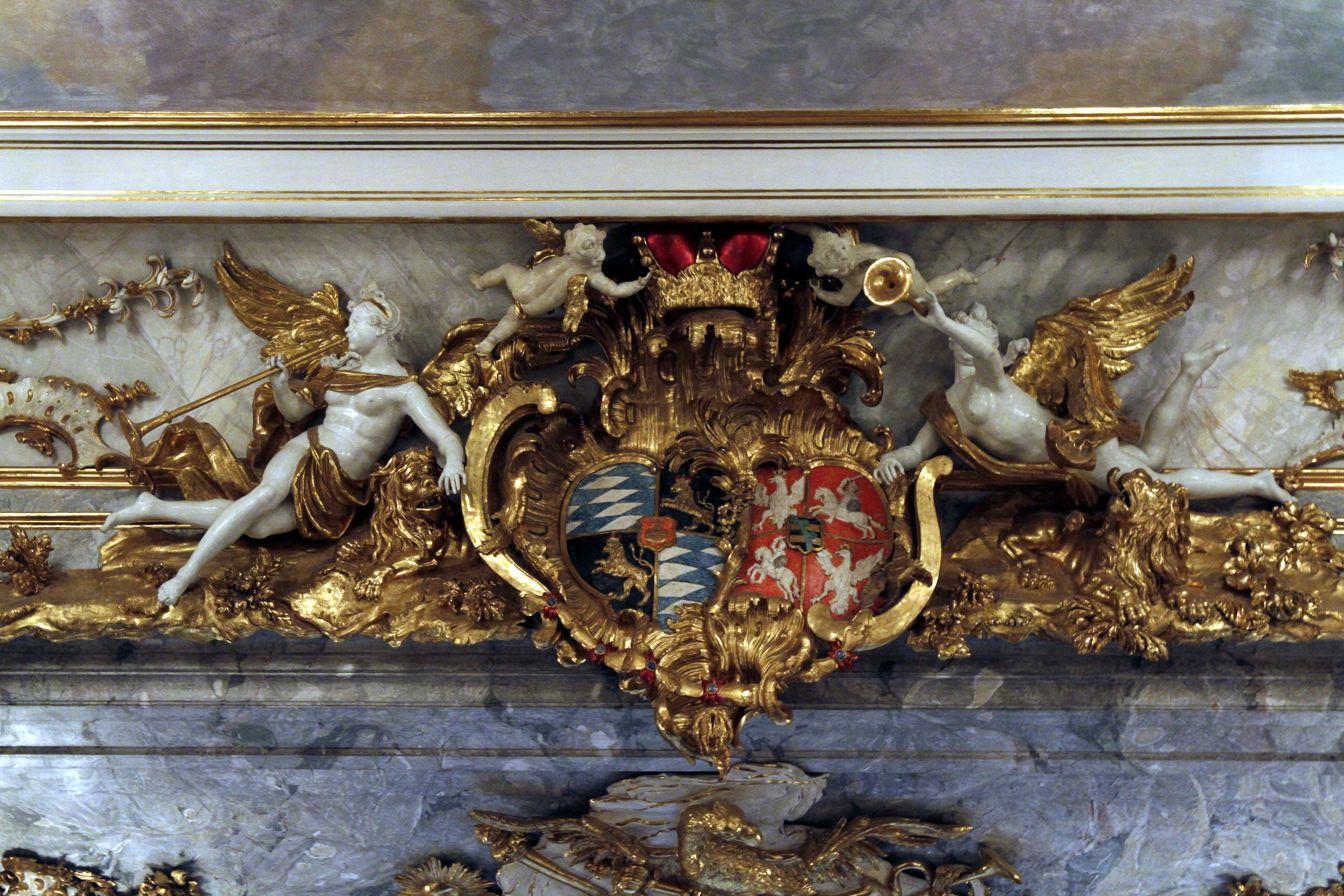
Rococo cartouche in the Cuvilliés Theatre, Munich, Germany, by François de Cuvilliés, 1751-1753

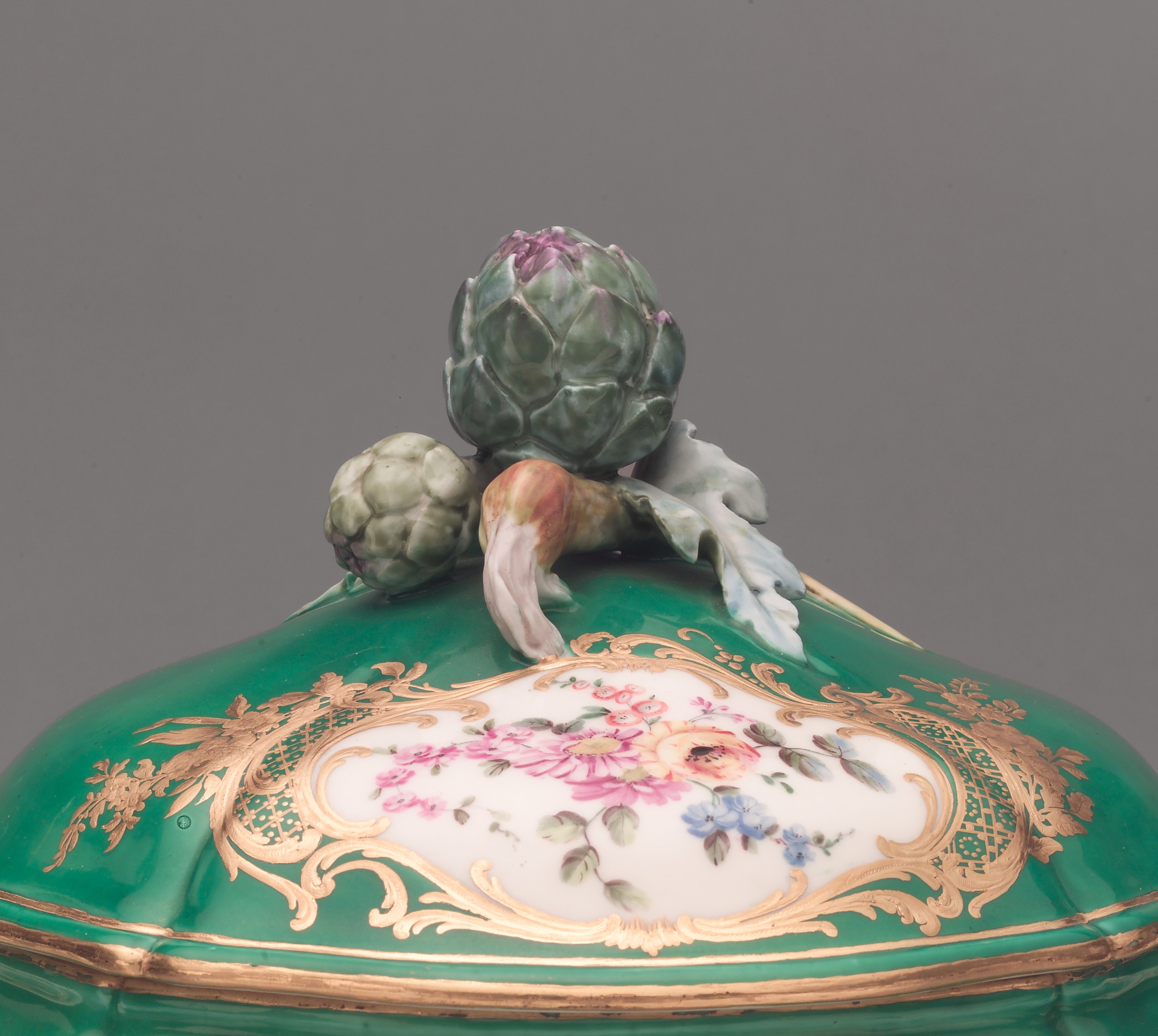
Rococo cartouche on a tureen, by the Sèvres porcelain factory, 1757–1758, soft-paste porcelain, Metropolitan Museum of Art

Rococo engraved tradecard of Percy Webster, clockmaker from London, c.1760, engraving, unknown location

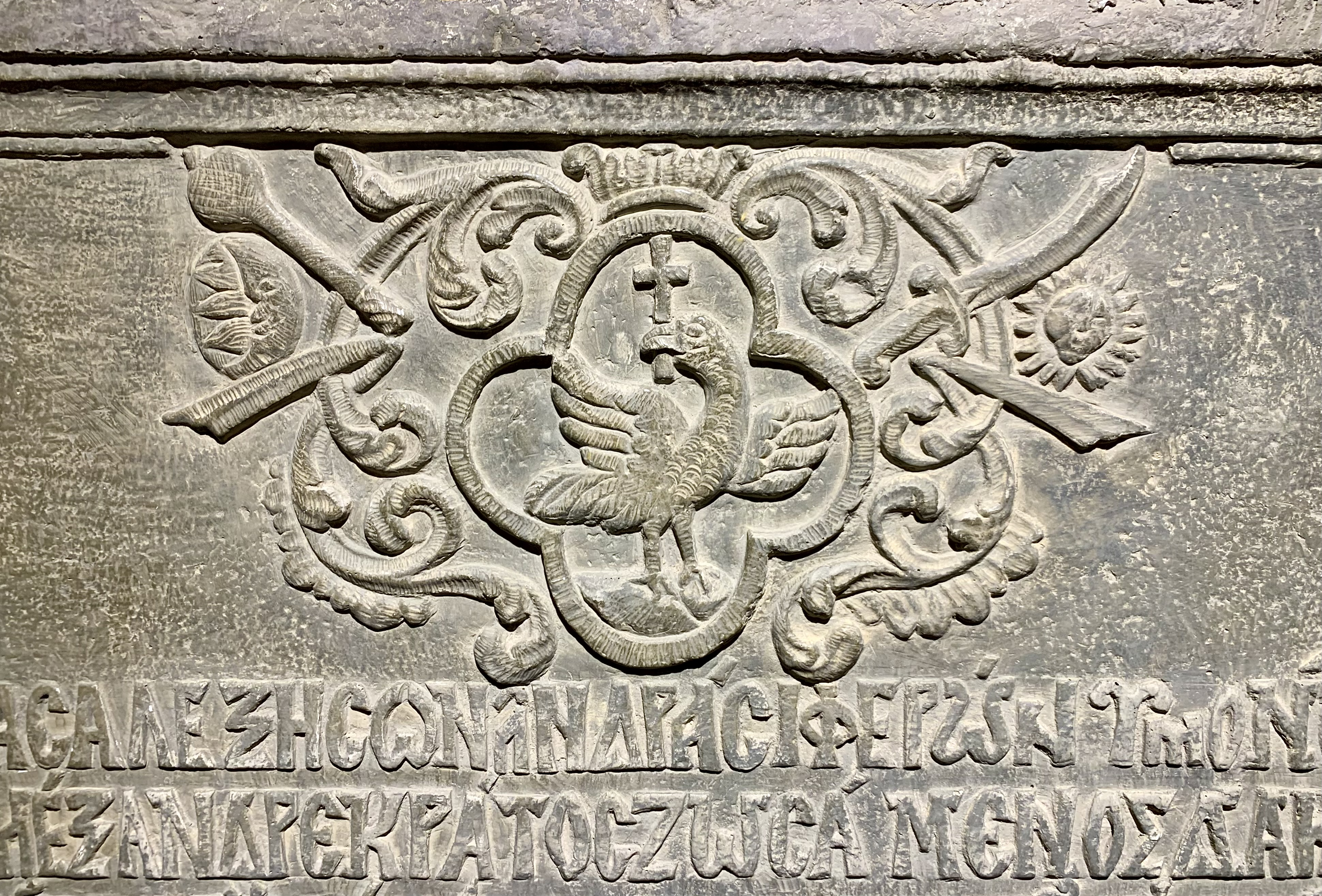
Brâncovenesc cartouche on the pisanie that records the erection of the Wallachian academy in Bucharest, Bucharest University Museum, unknown architect or sculptor, 1776

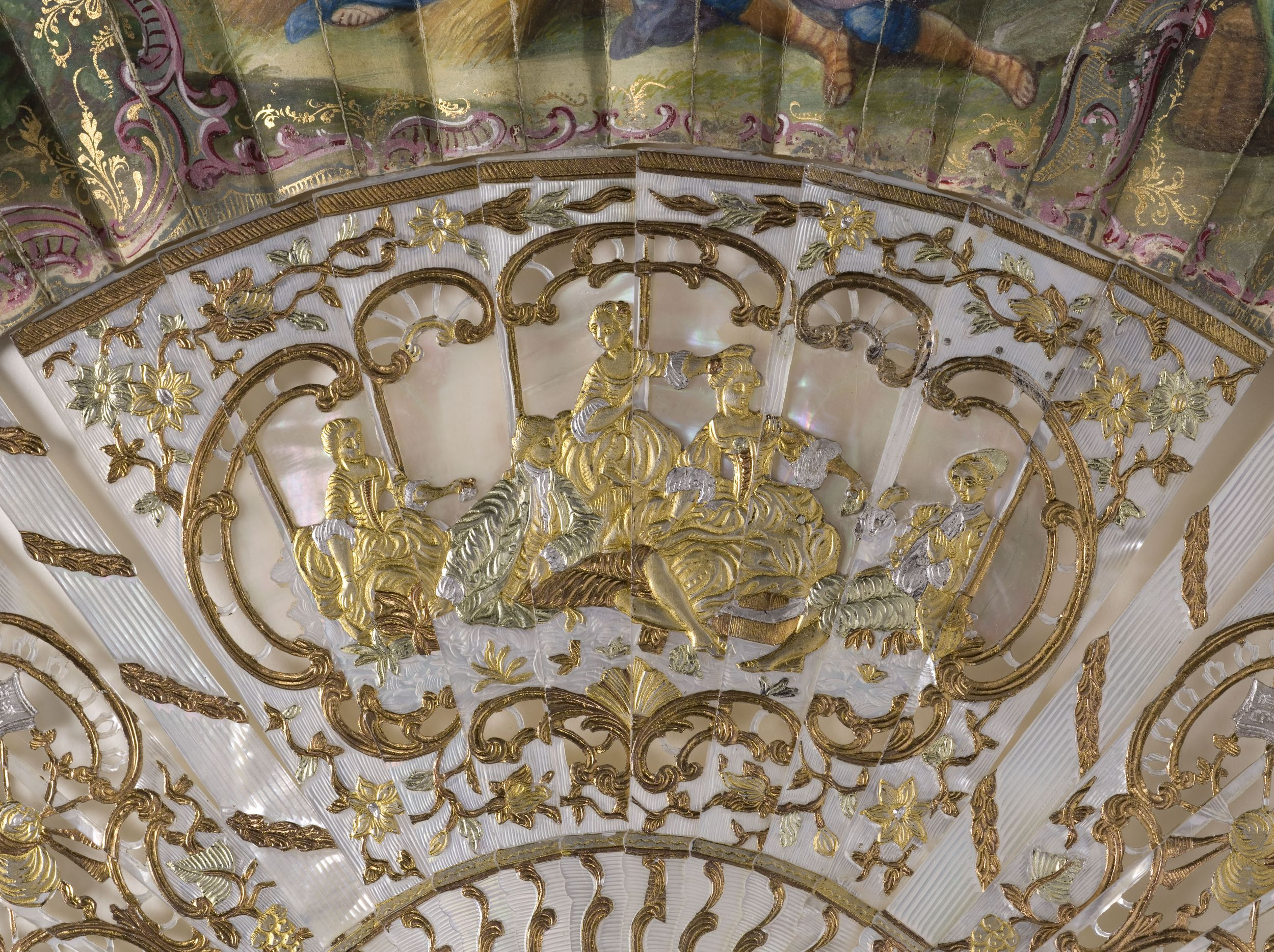
Rococo Revival cartouche on a fan, unknown designer and producer, c.1850, paper, gouache, gilding, mother-of-pearl, Musée Galliera, Paris

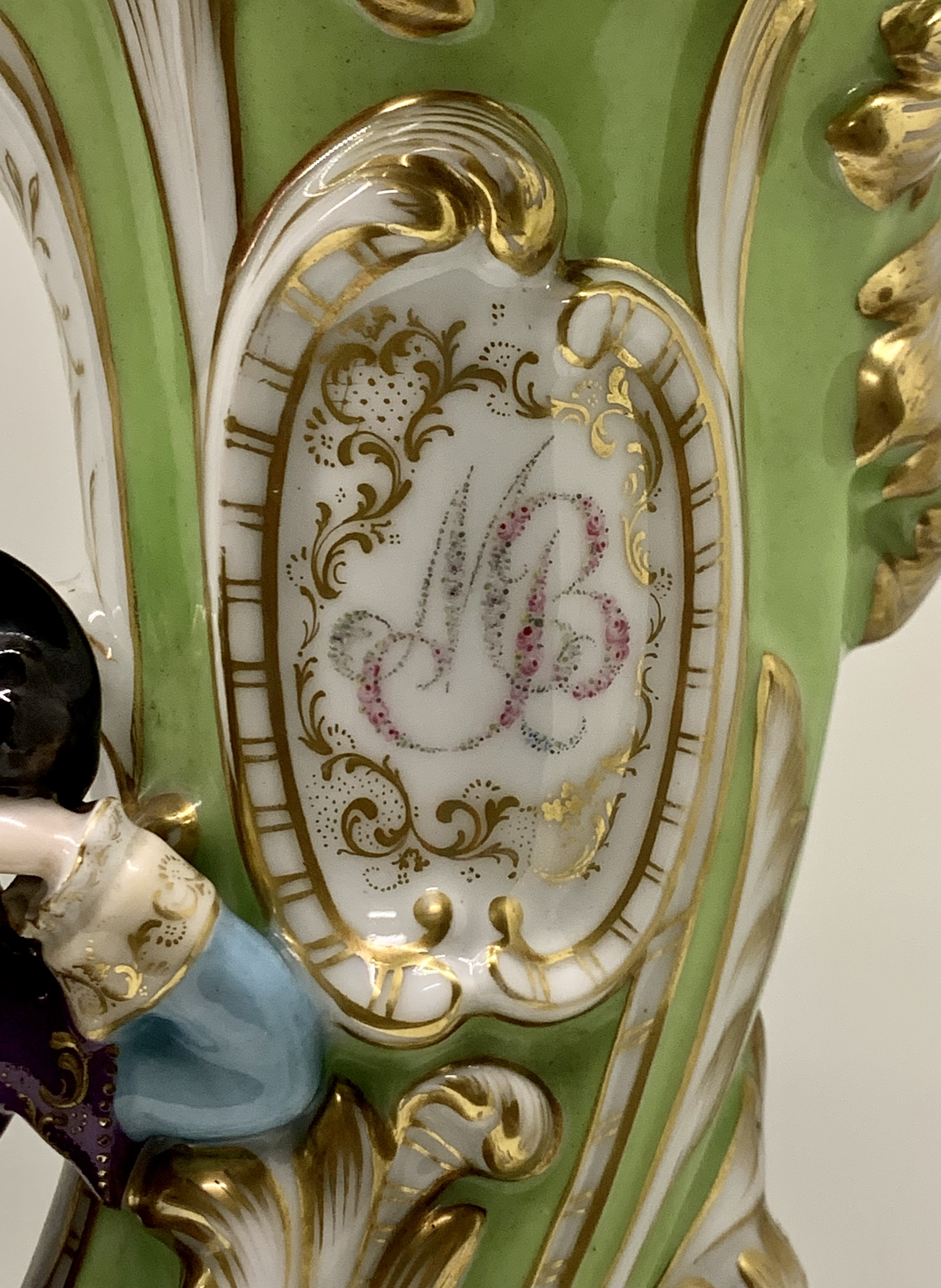
Rococo Revival cartouche ob a cone-shaped vase, part of a pair, by Nicolas Bugeard?, mid-19th century, hard-paste porcelain, painted and gilded, Museum of Decorative Arts, Paris

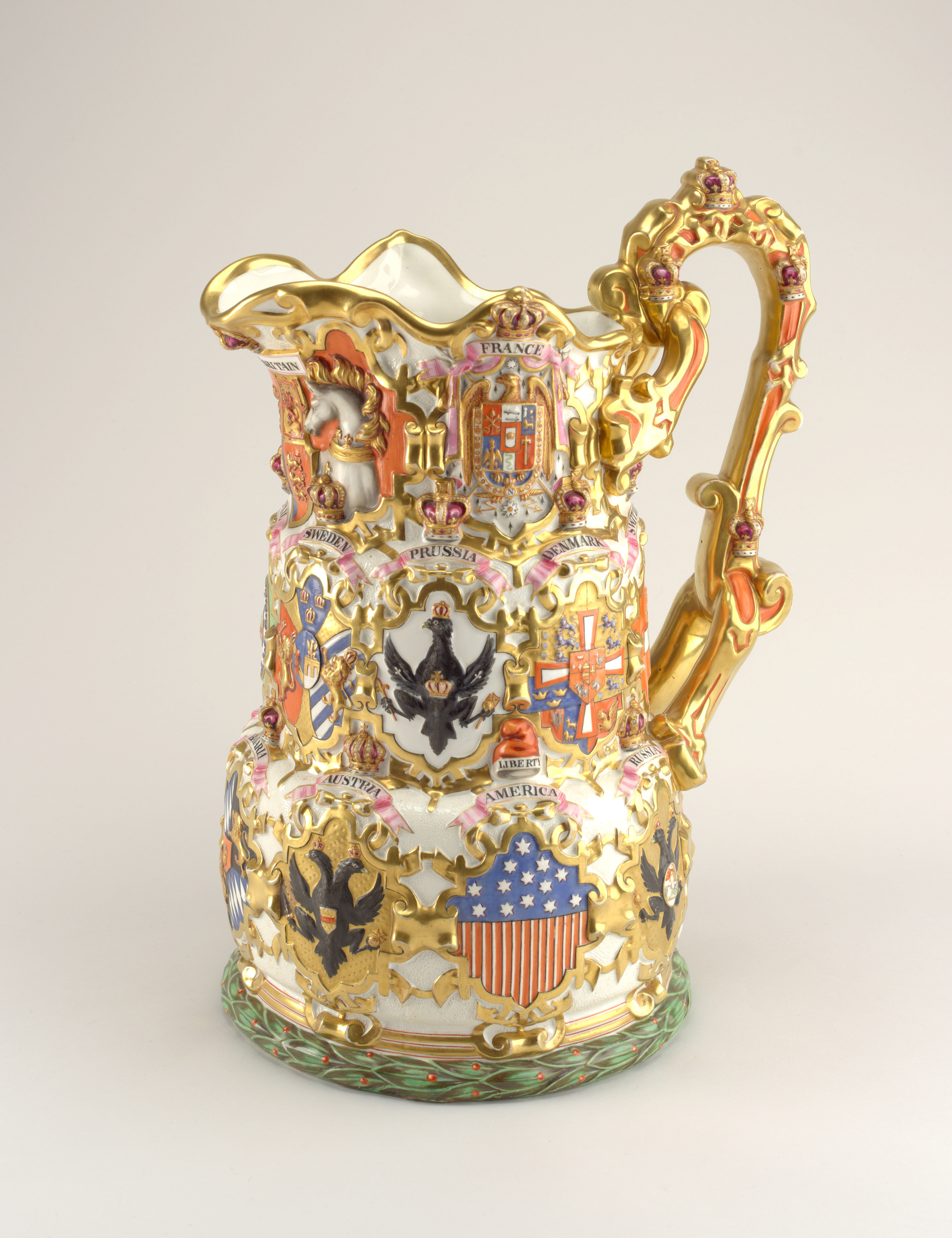
Renaissance Revival cartouches on a pitcher decorated with coats of arms, unknown artist or producer, 1855, porcelain, overglaze enameling and gilding, Cooper Hewitt, Smithsonian Design Museum, New York City

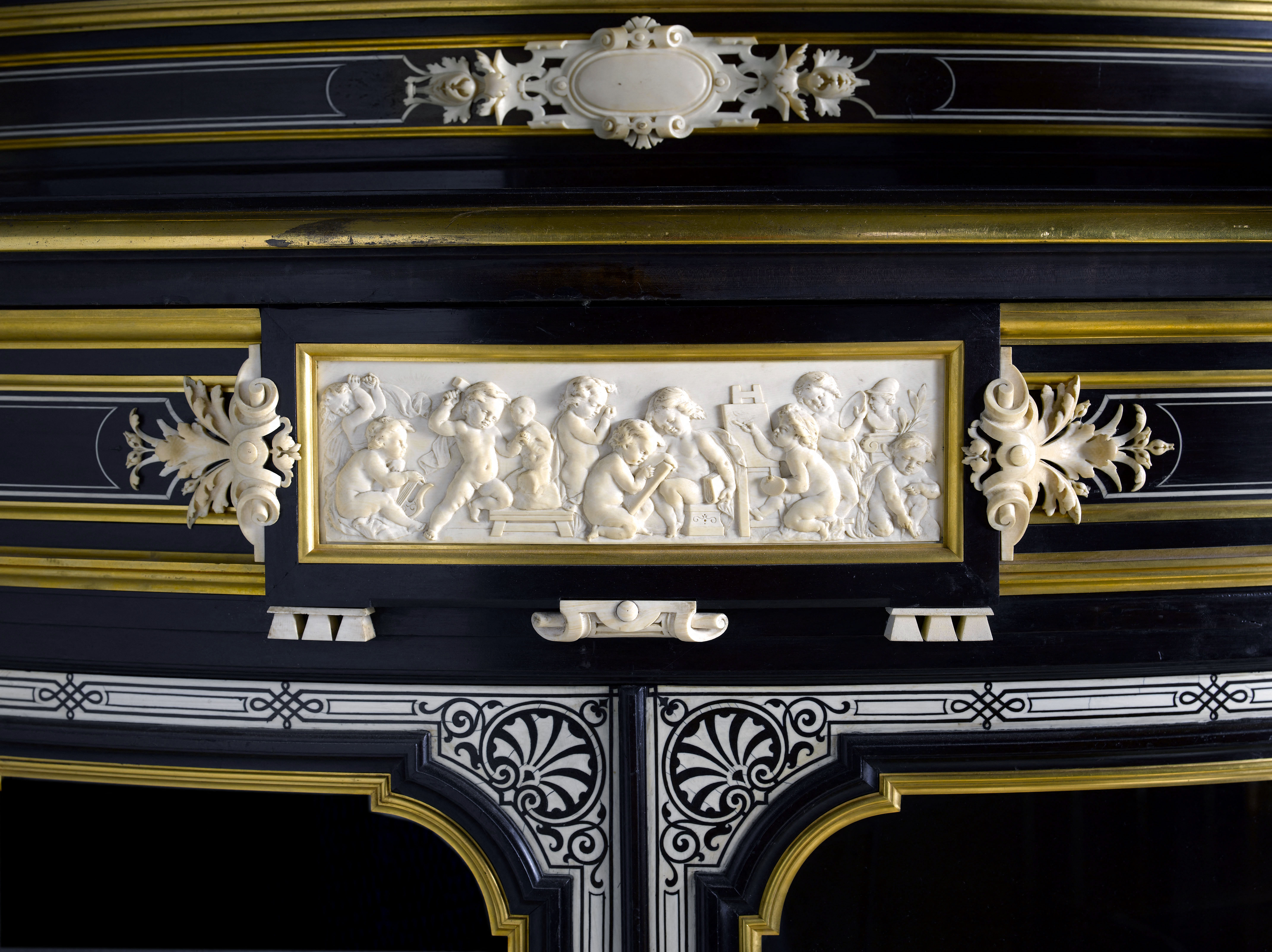
Renaissance Revival cartouches on a display case, designed by Eugène Prignot and Albert-Ernest Carrier de Belleuse, and sculpted by Bernard, 1867, wood and ivory, Petit Palais, Paris

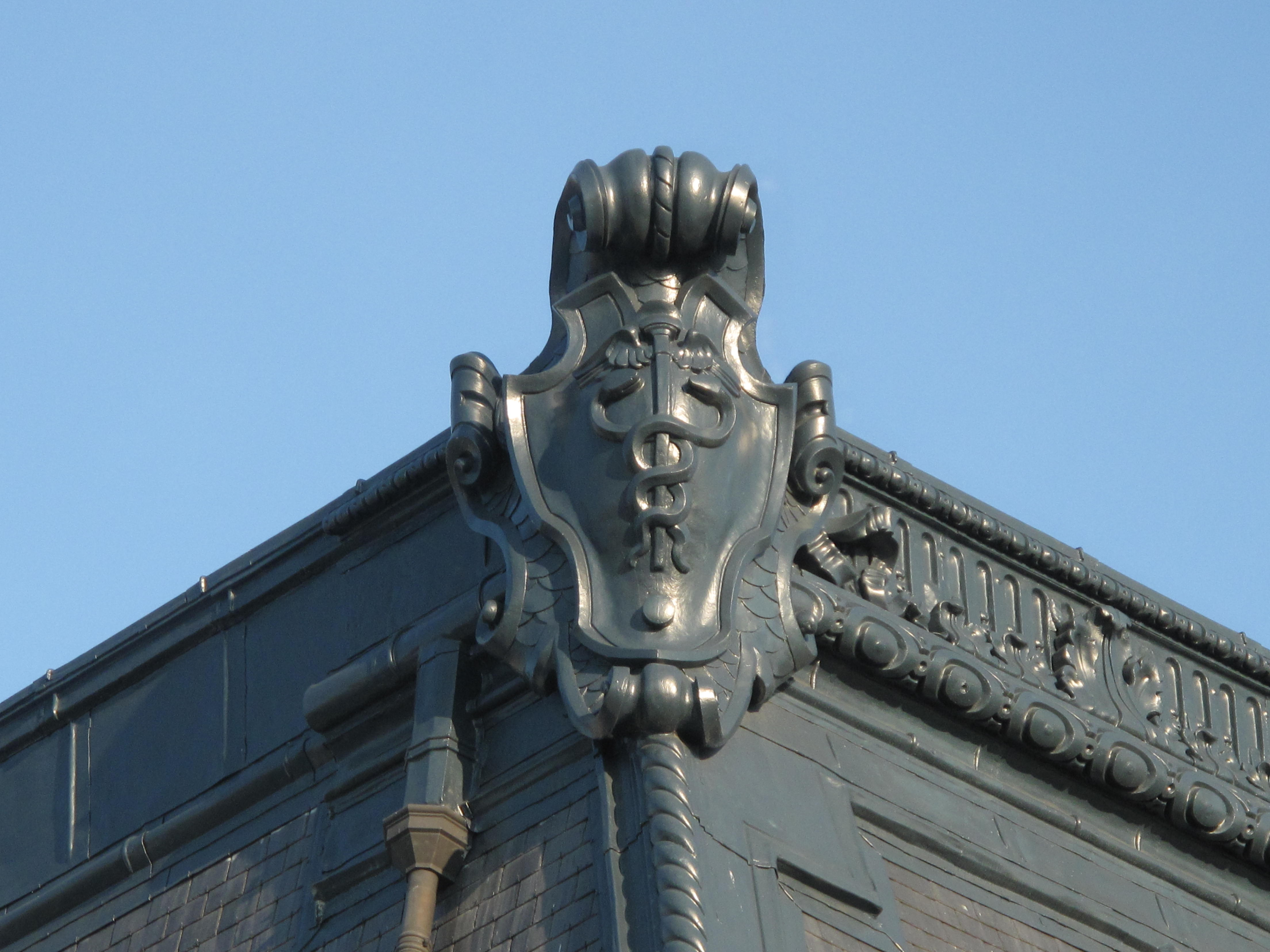
Beaux Arts cartouche with a caduceus, on the roof of the Crédit Lyonnais headquarters (Boulevard des Italiens no. 17-23), Paris, by William Bouwens van der Boijen, 1876-1883

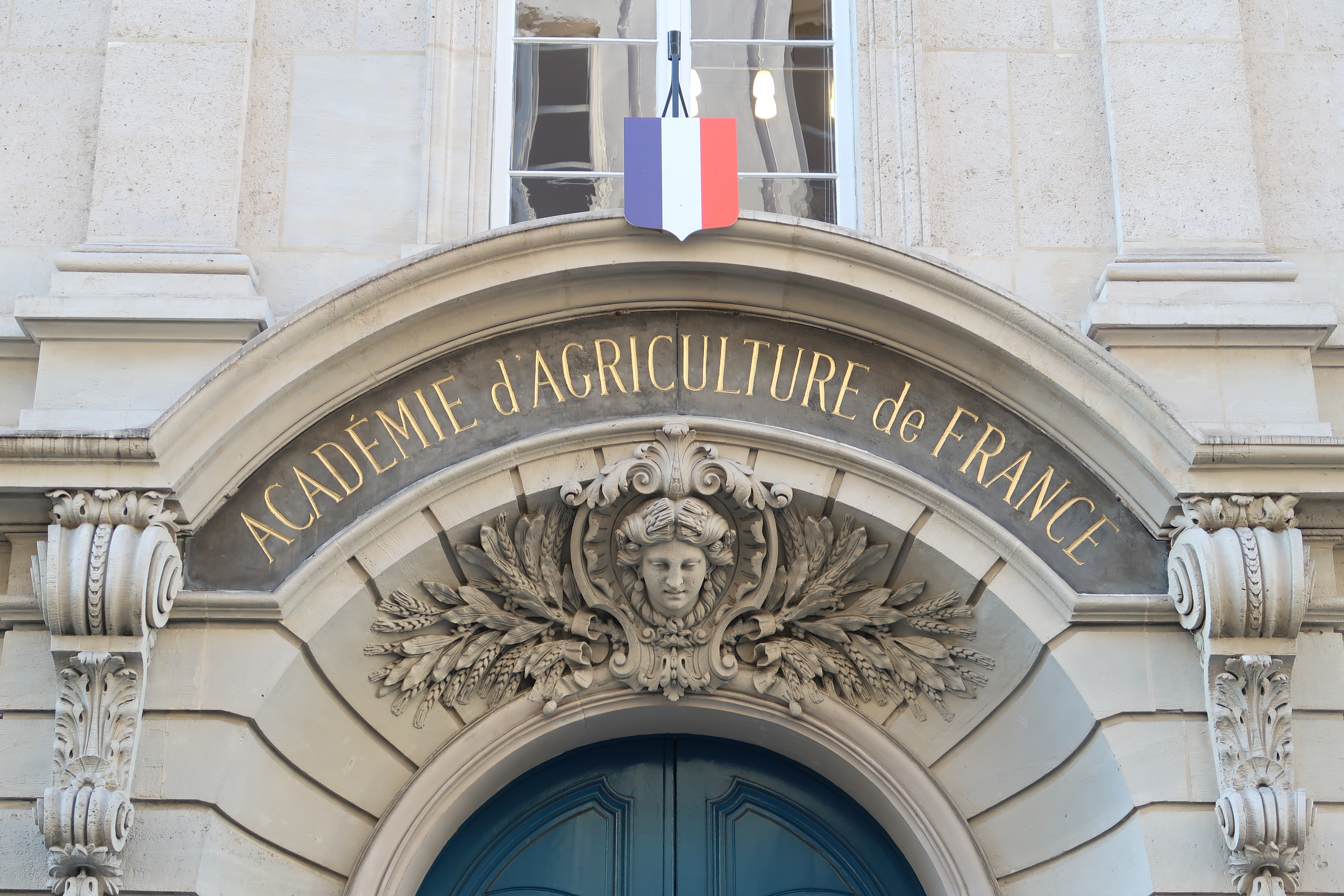
Beaux Arts cartouche with a mascaron, above the entrance door of the Académie d'Agriculture de France, Paris, unknown architect, 1878

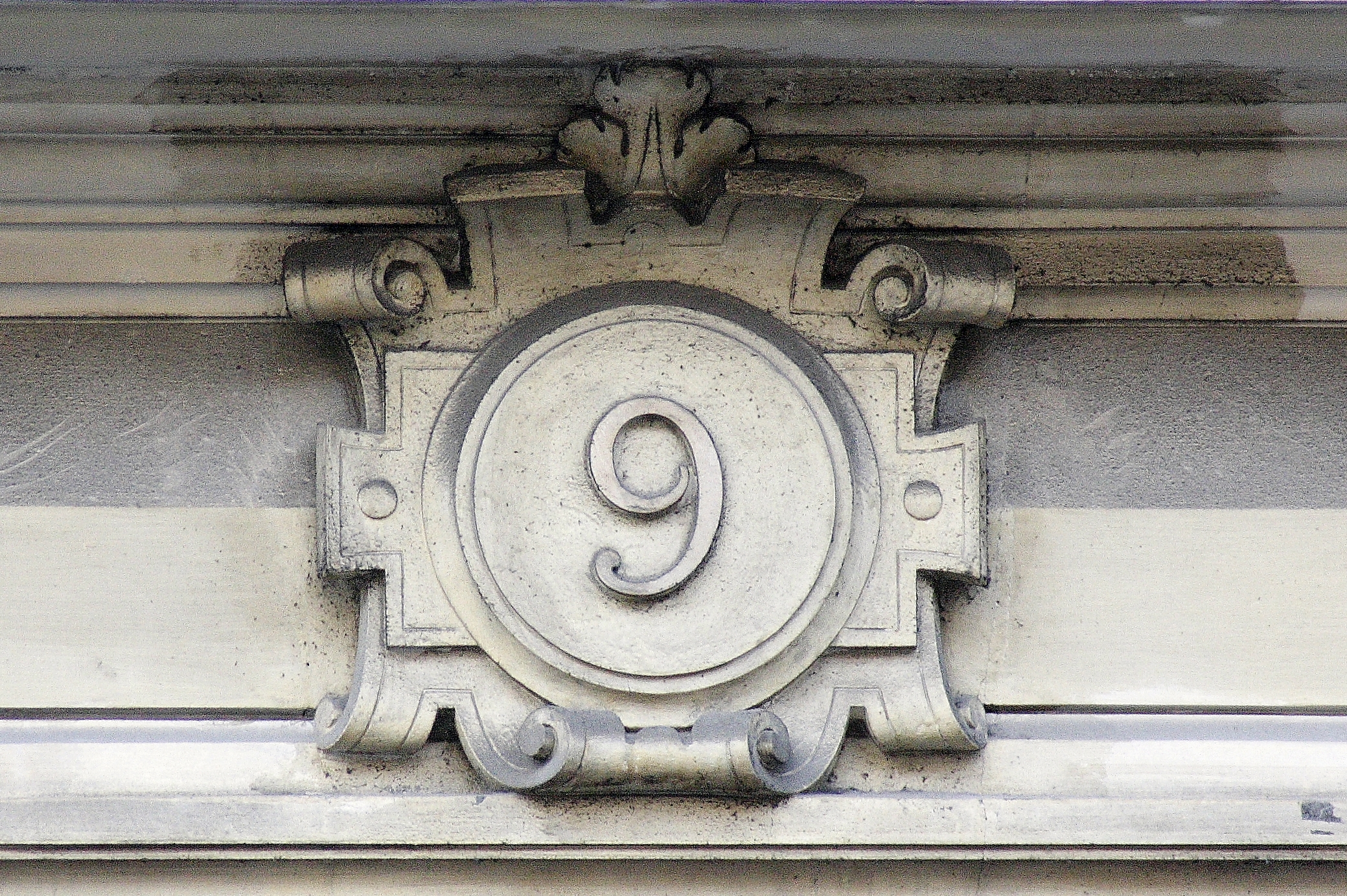
Renaissance Revival cartouche of Rue des Archives no. 9, Paris, unknown architect, c.1880

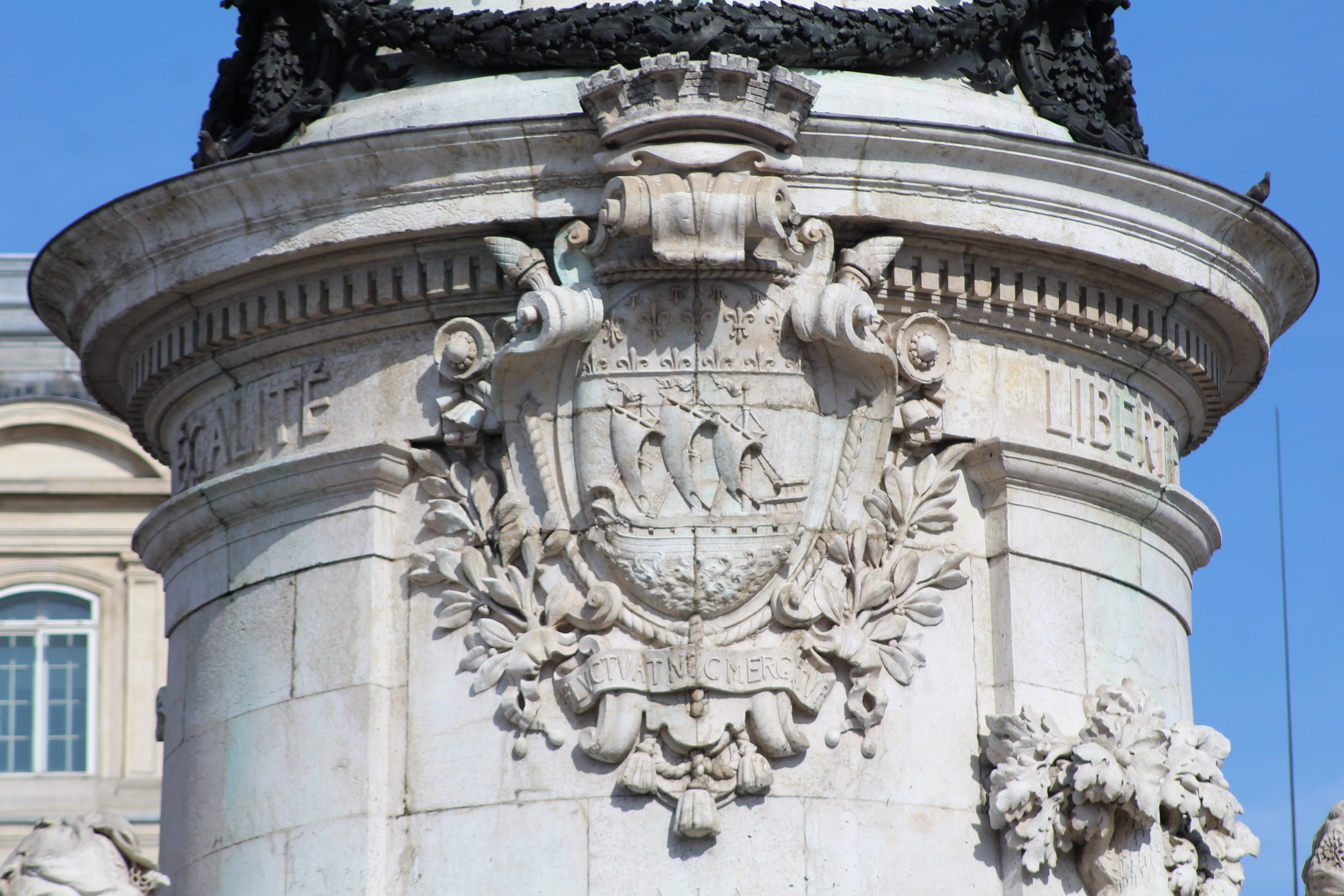
Beaux Arts mascaron on the Monument à la République by Place de la République, Paris, sculpted by Léopold Morice and designed by François-Charles Morice, 1883

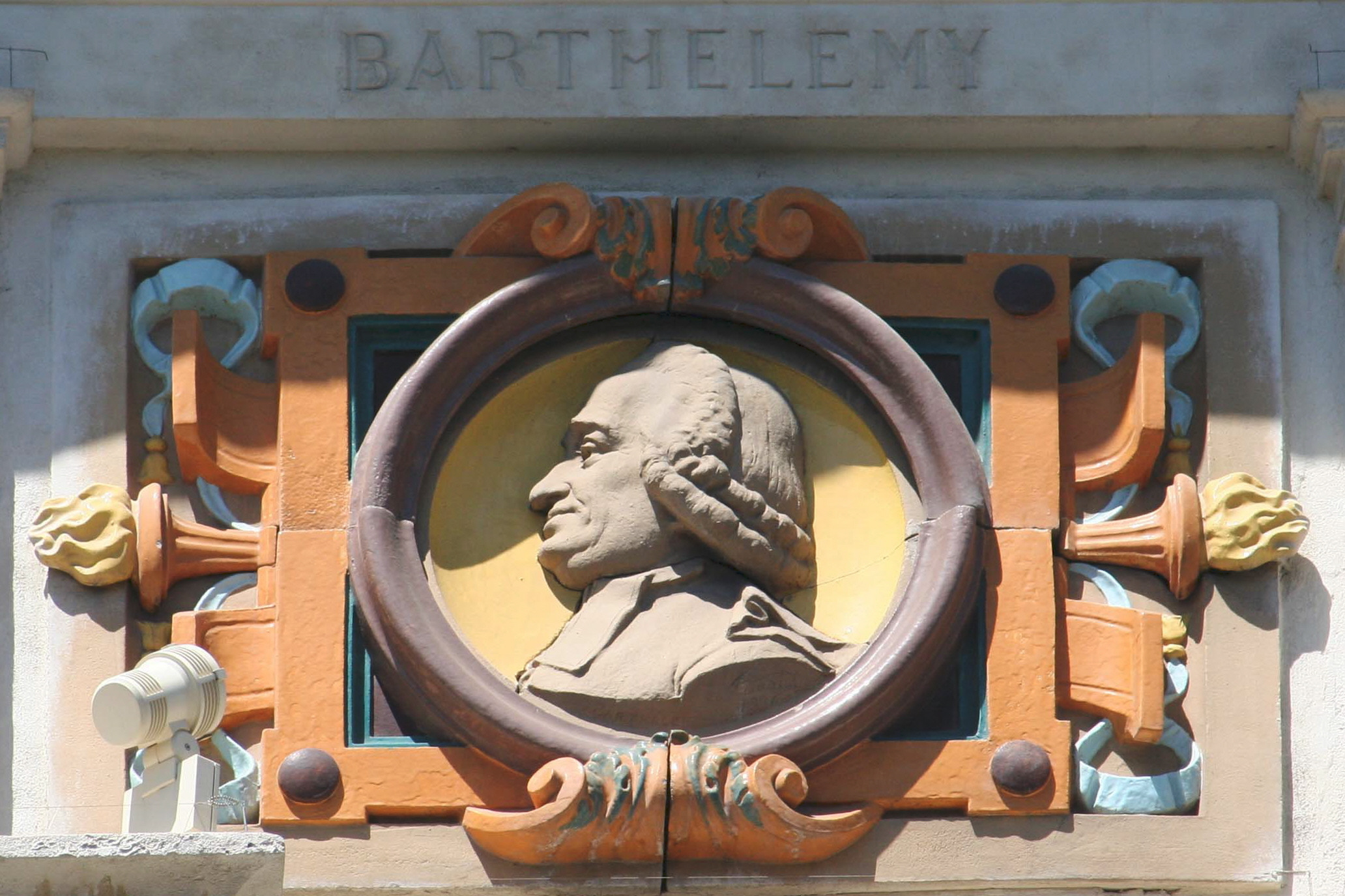
Renaissance Revival polychrome cartouche on the facade of the Toulon Art Museum, designed by Gaudensi Allar and sculpted by Victorien Bastet, c.1888

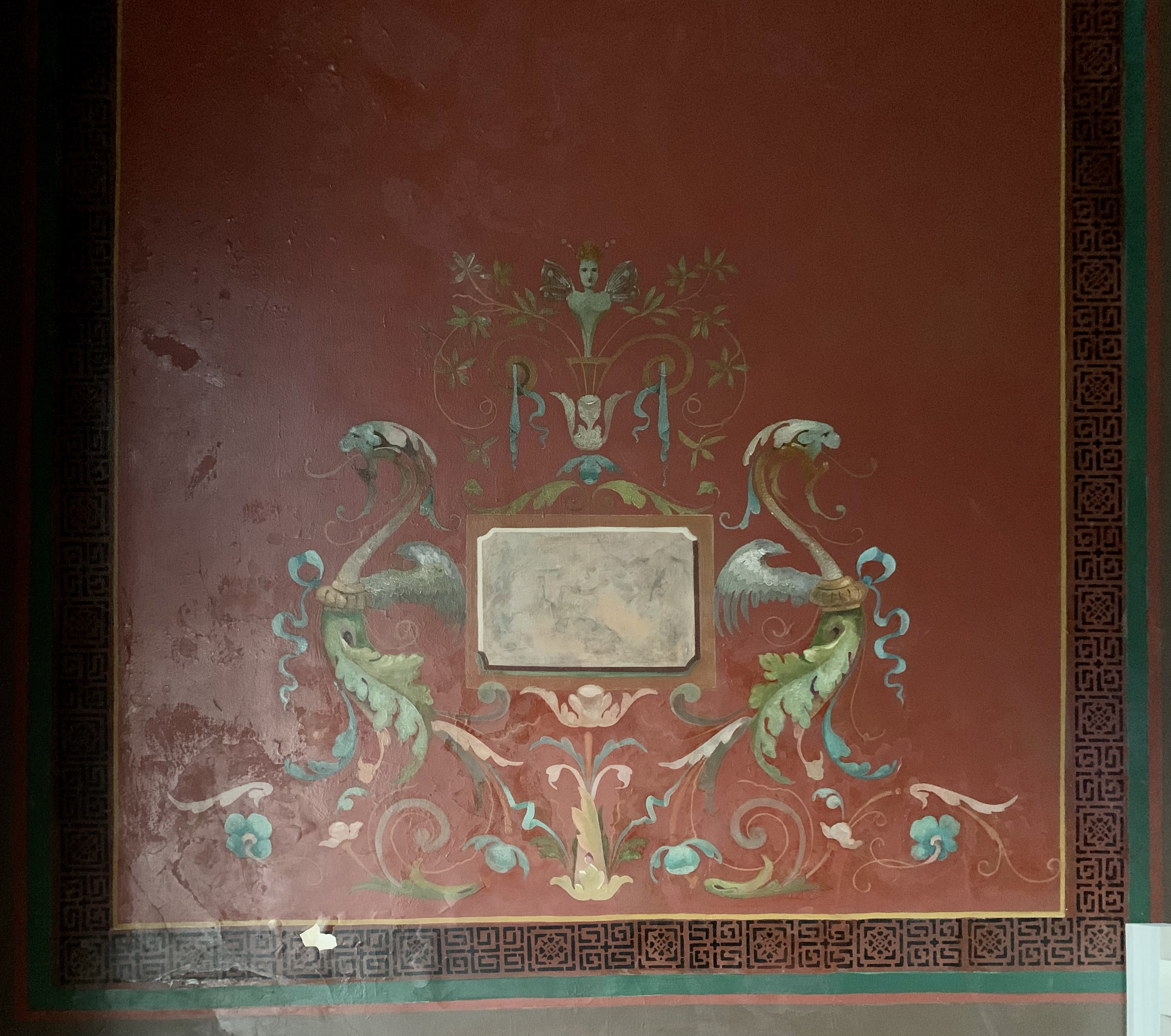
Neoclassical cartouche on a Pompeian style wall in Strada Nicolae Filipescu no. 45, Bucharest, Romania, unknown architect or painter, c.1890

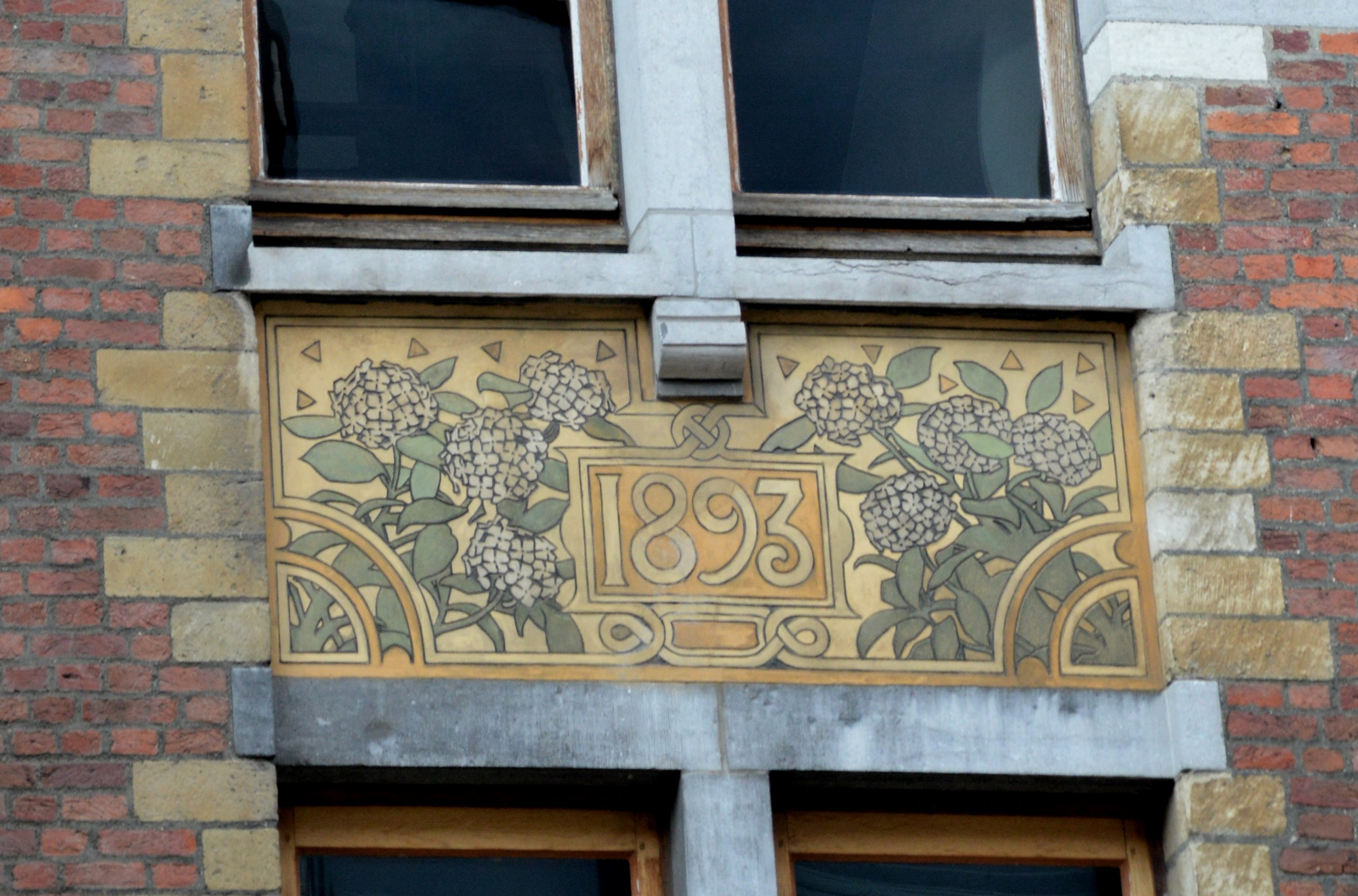
Art Nouveau sgraffito cartouche on the Hankar House, Brussels, Belgium, sgraffito by Adolphe Crespin, 1893

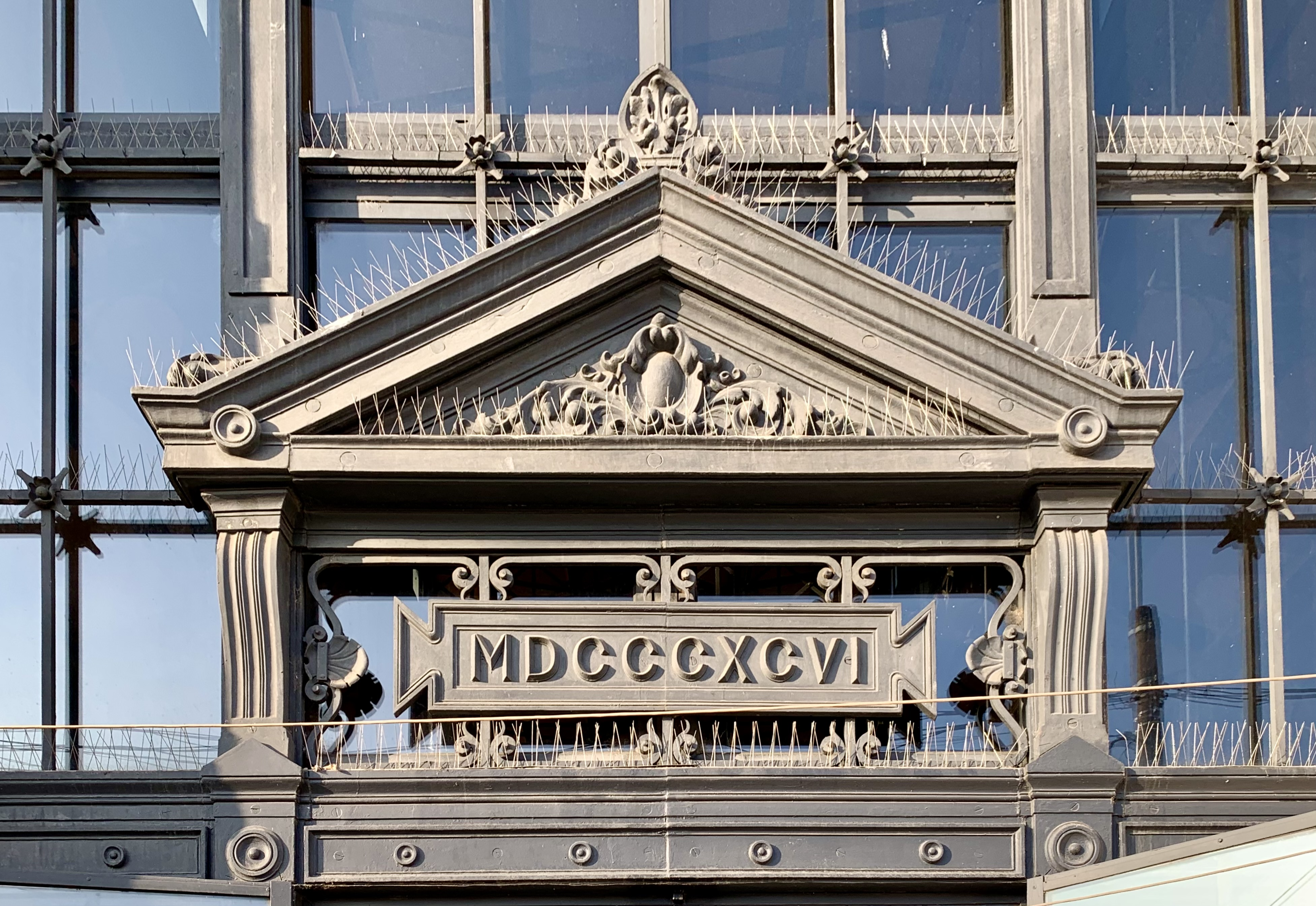
Neoclassical cartouches in and under a pediment of the Traian Hall (Calea Călărașilor no. 133), Bucharest, by Giulio Magno, 1896

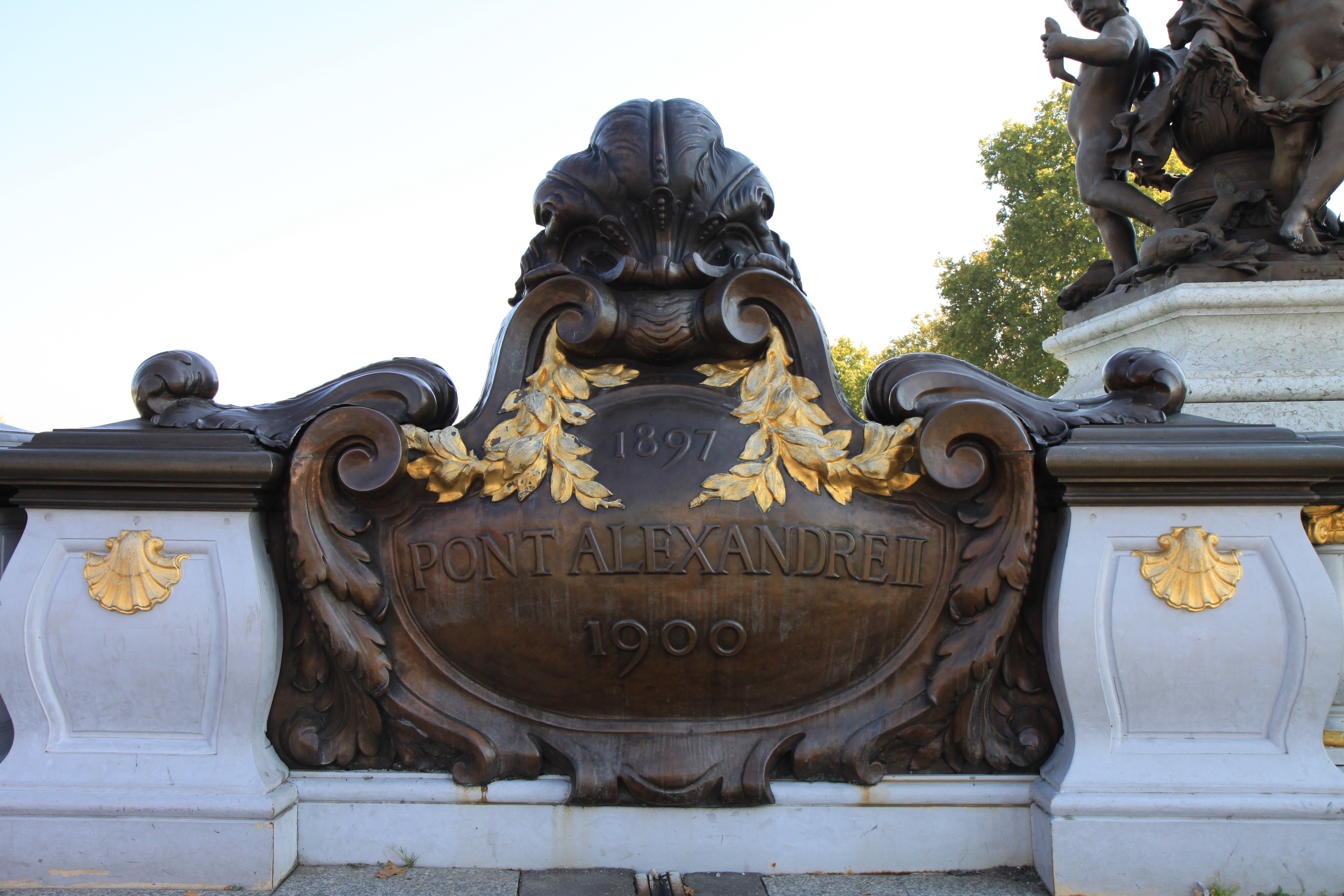
Beaux-Arts cartouche of the Pont Alexandre III, Paris, designed by Joseph Cassien-Bernard and Gaston Cousin, 1896-1900

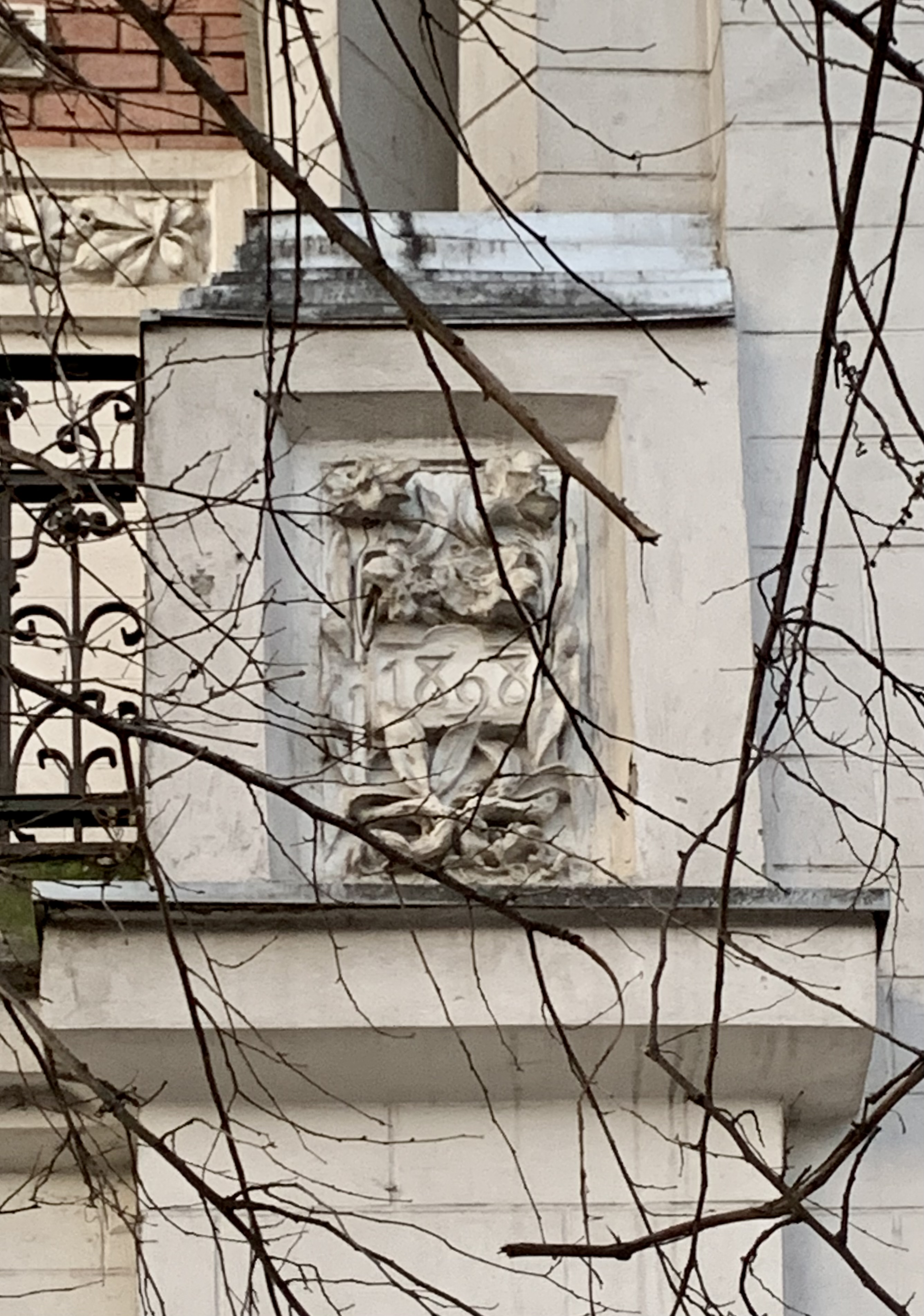
Art Nouveau cartouche on the Alexandru Gr. Ionescu House (Bulevardul Lascăr Catargiu no. 4), Bucharest, by Eduard Romantxo, 1898

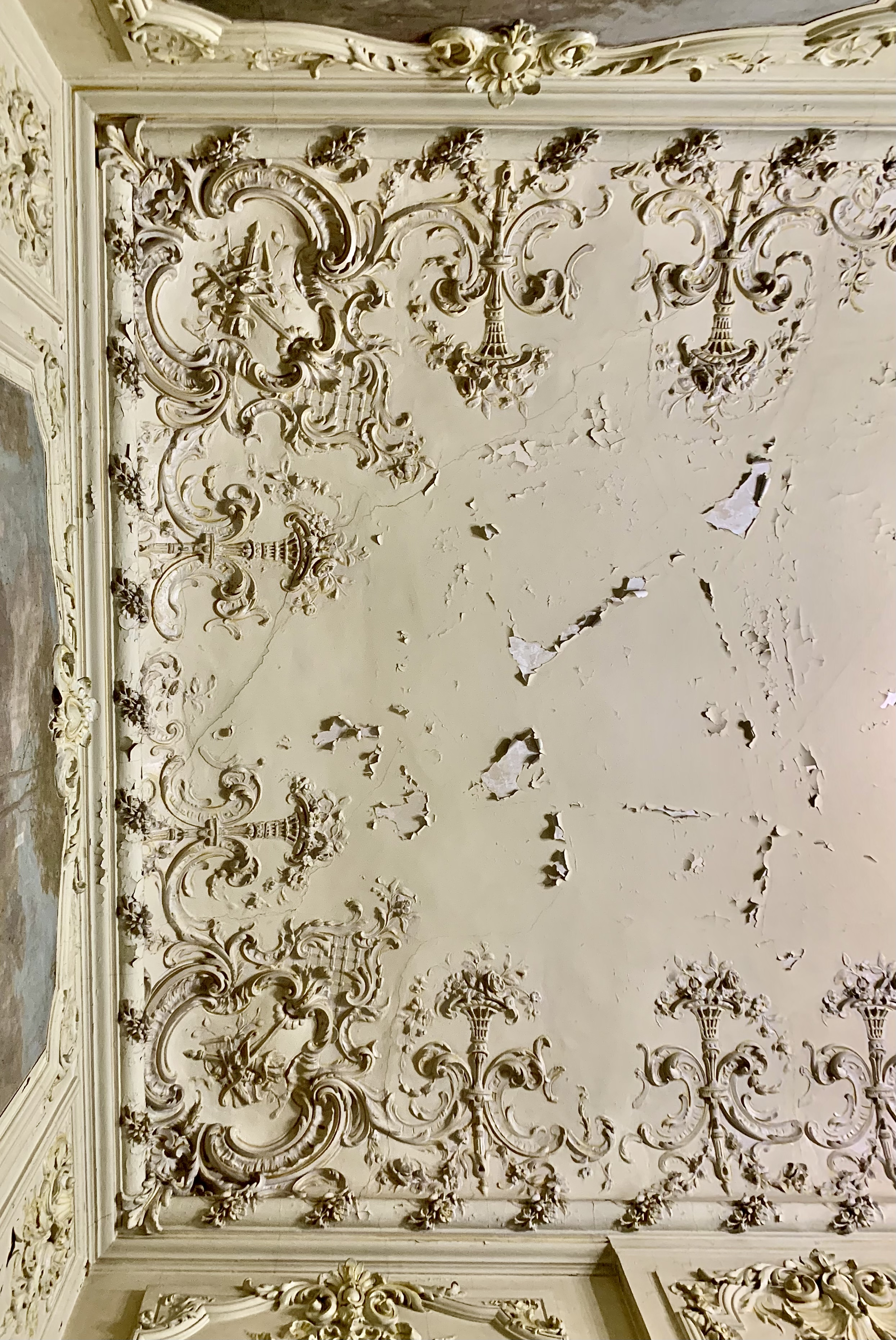
Rococo Revival stucco with cartouches in the corners on a ceiling of the Cantacuzino Palace, Bucharest, by Ion D. Berindey, 1898-1906

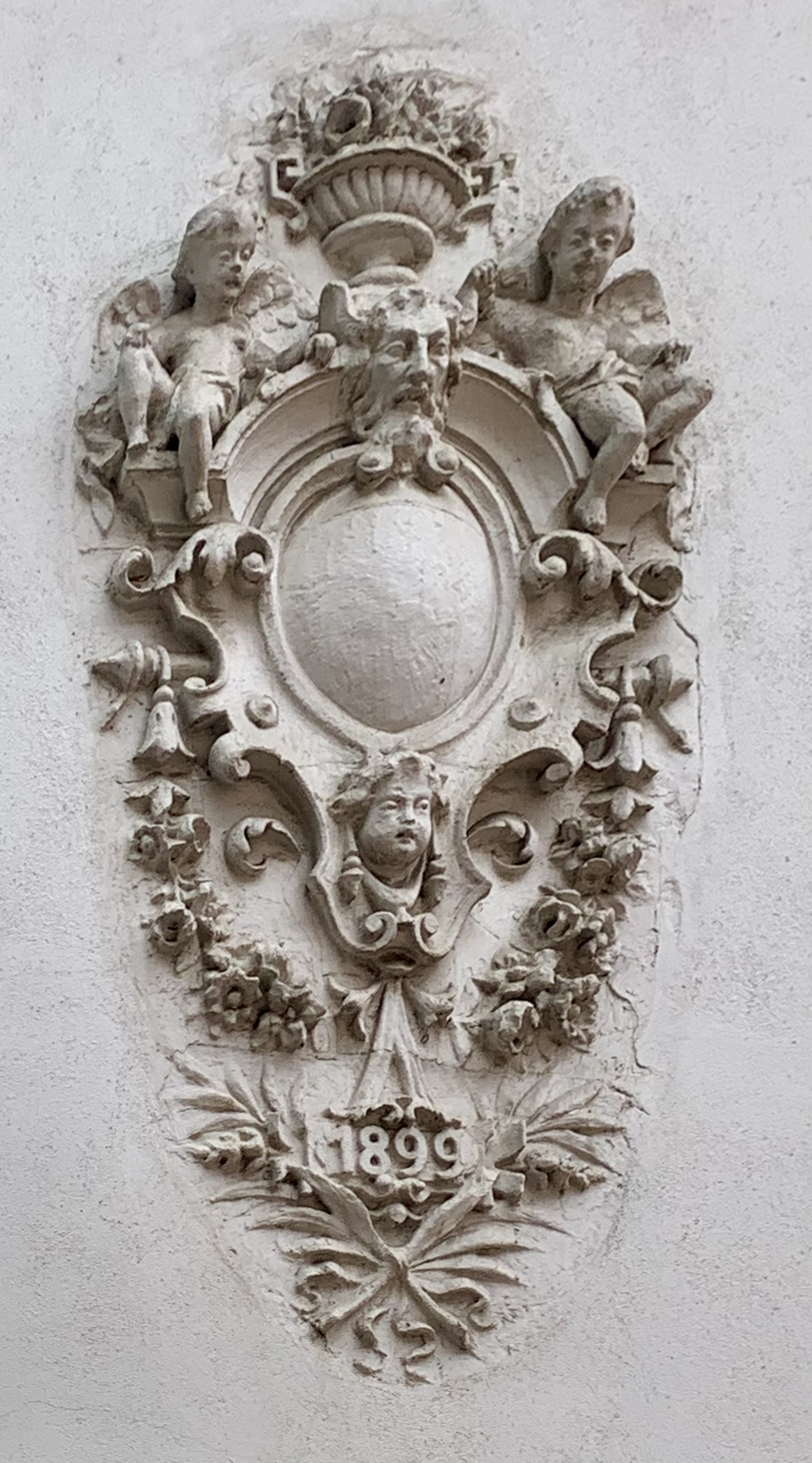
Complex Beaux Arts cartouche of Intrarea Costache Negri no. 1, Bucharest, unknown architect, 1899

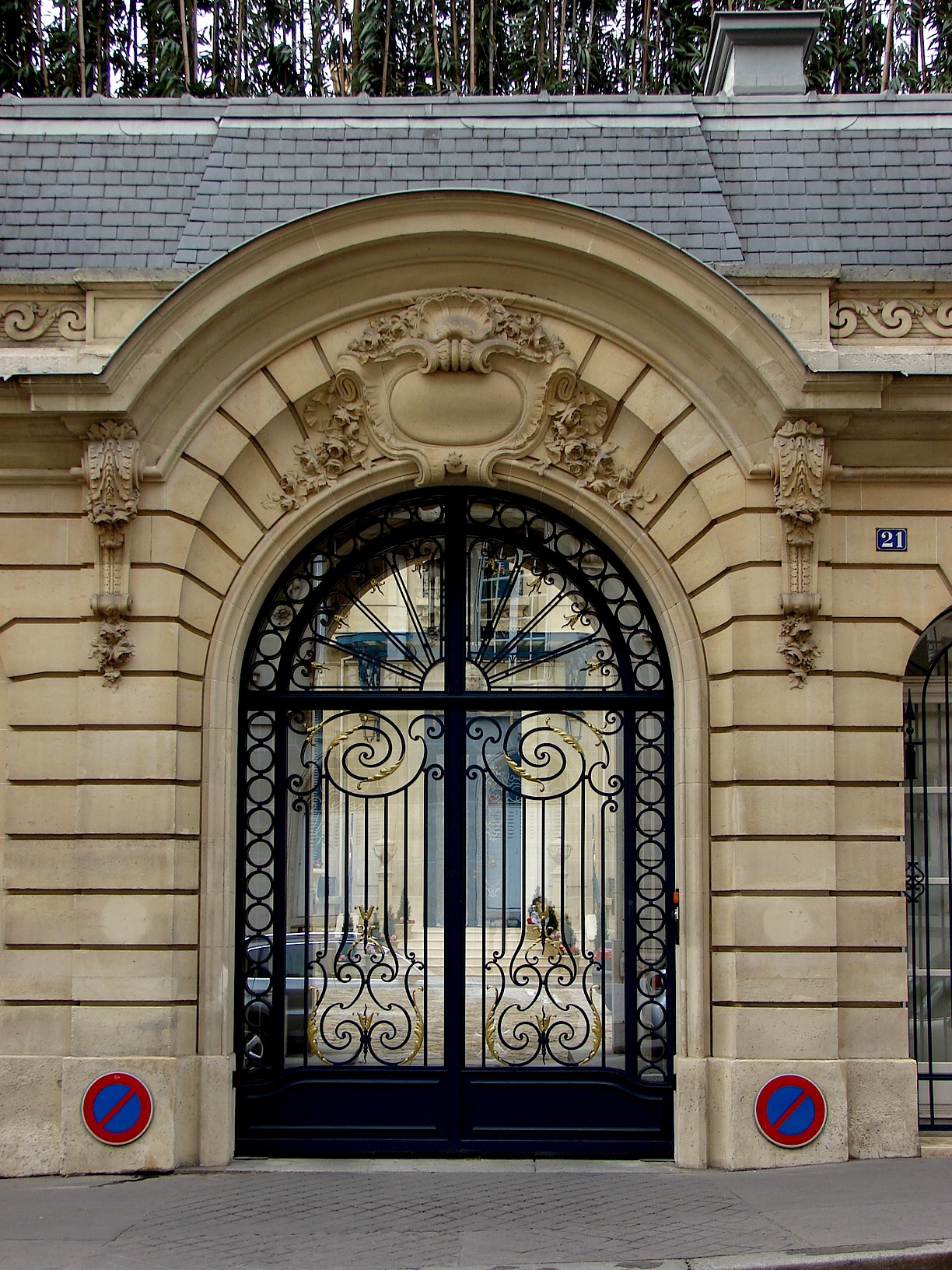
Beaux Arts cartouche above the entrance of the Hôtel Le Vavasseur (Rue Boissière no. 21), Paris, by Ernest Sanson, 1899

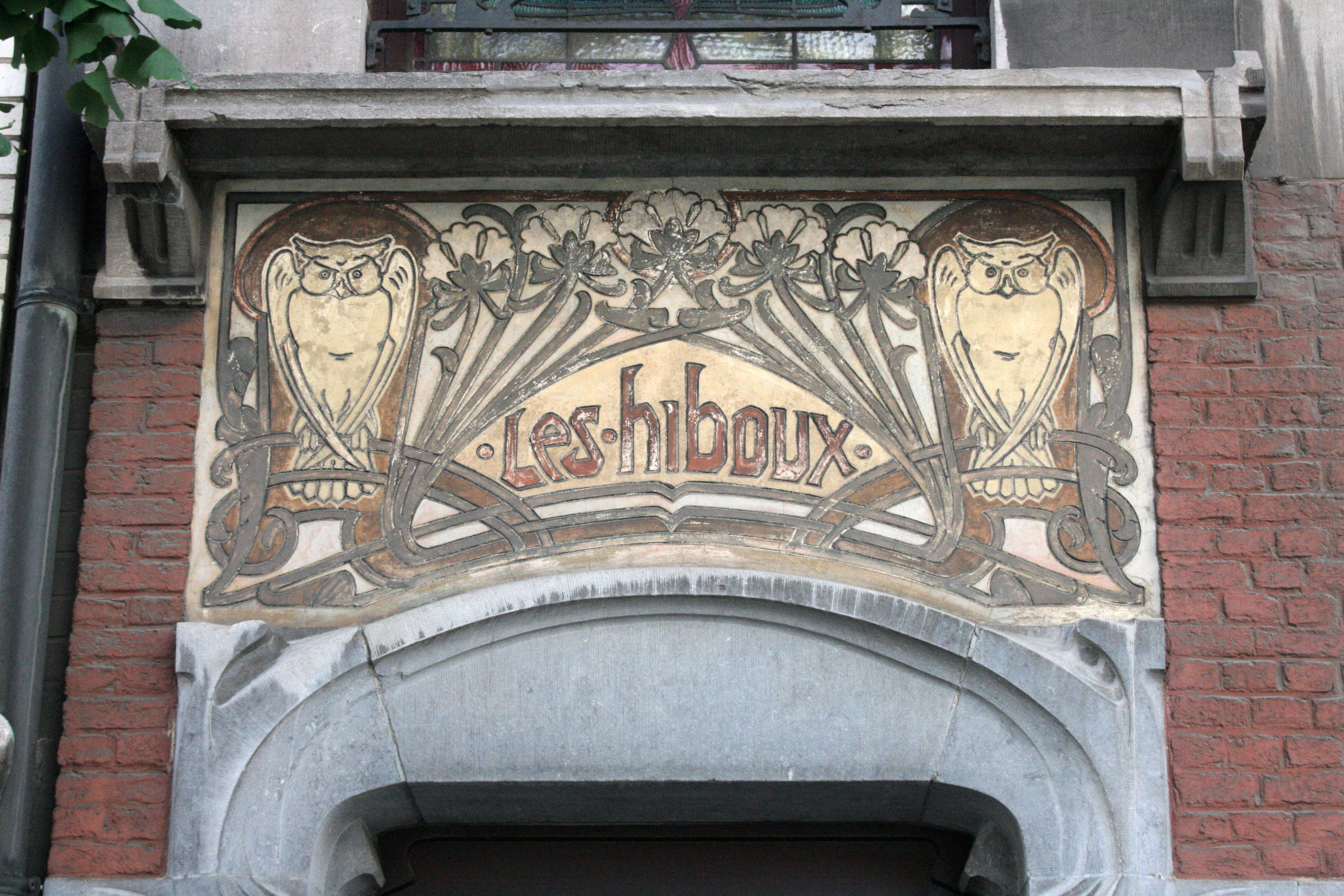
Art Nouveau sgraffito cartouche of the Maison les Hiboux (Avenue Brugmann no. 53), Brussels, by Édouard Pelseneer, 1899

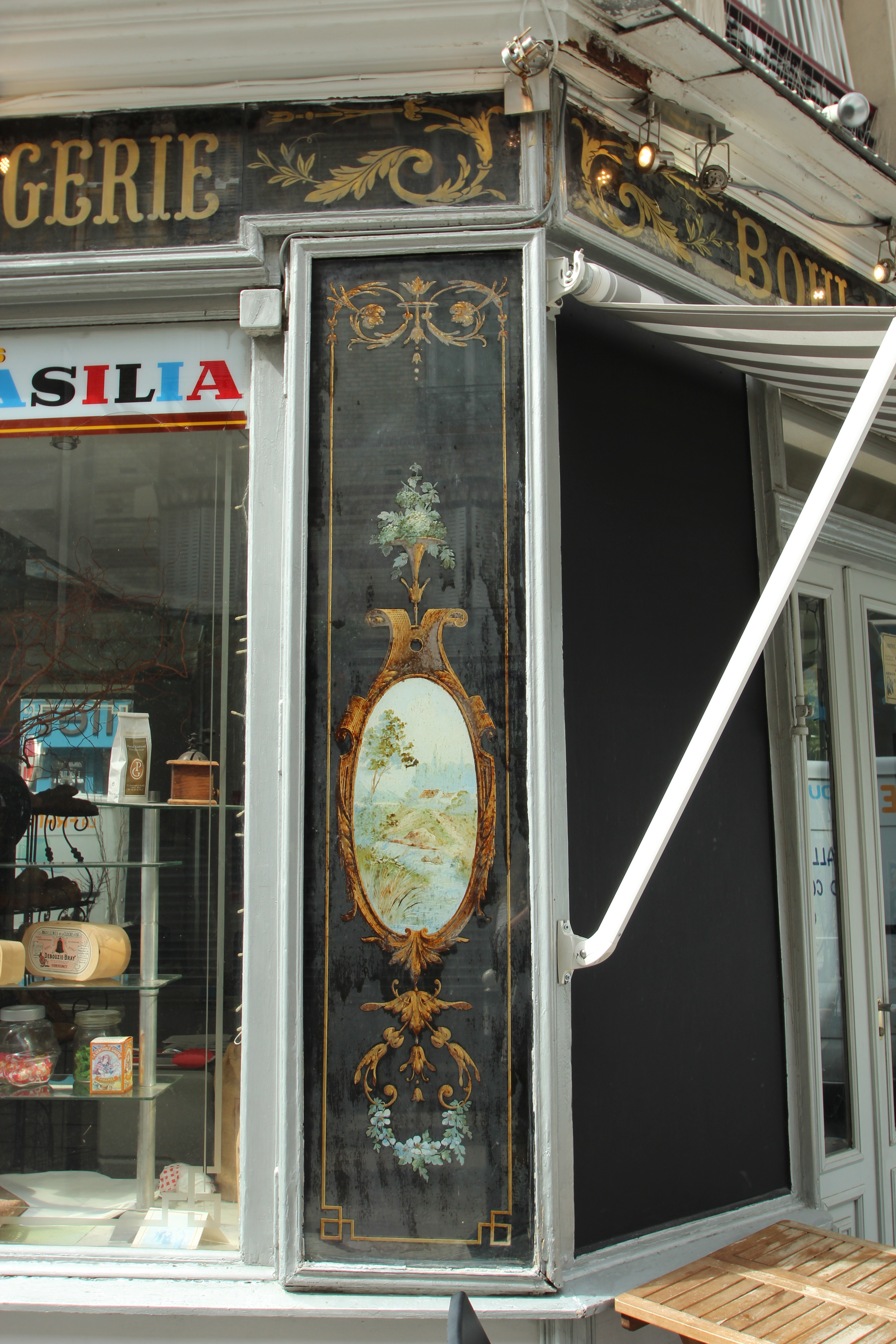
Beaux Arts cartouche on facade of the Cozette Boulangerie (Rue Montgallet no. 19), Paris, unknown architect or painter, late 19th century

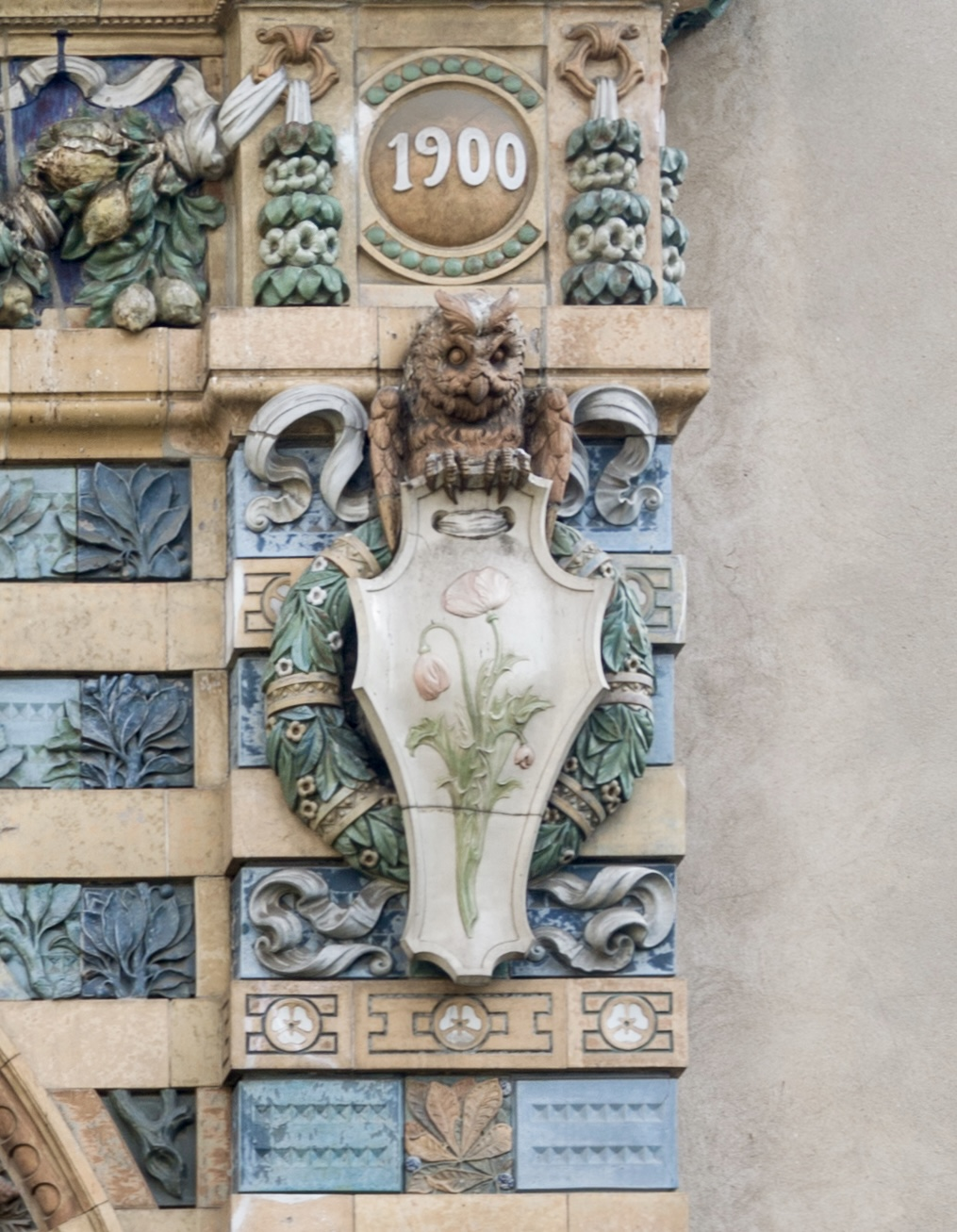
Stylized Beaux Arts cartouche of the Monumental Portico Jules-Félix Coutan in the Square Félix-Desruelles, Paris, by Jules Coutan or Charles-Auguste Risler, before 1900

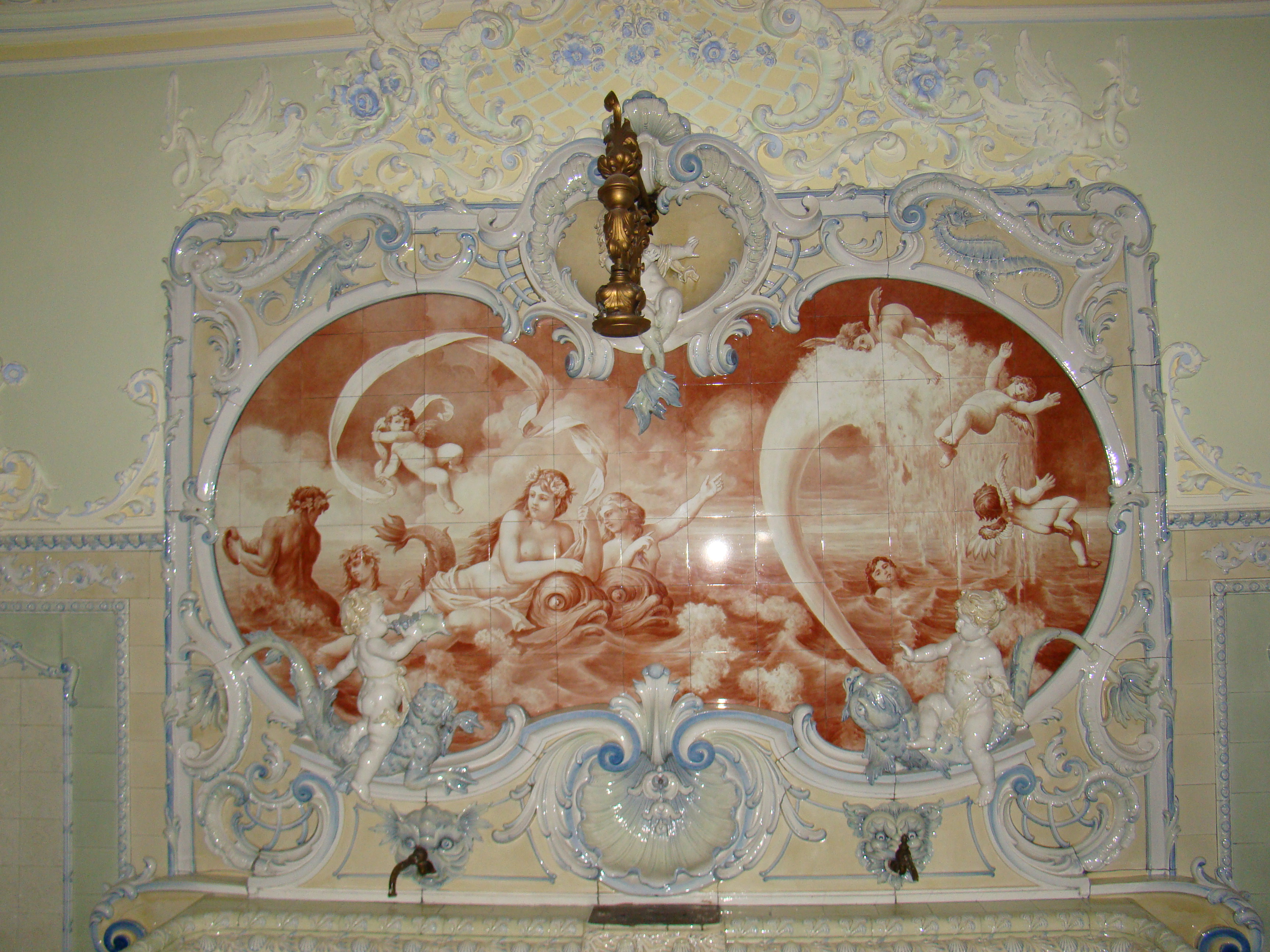
Rococo Revival cartouche in the bathroom of the Dietel Palace, Sosnowiec, Poland, by architect Waligórski, 1900

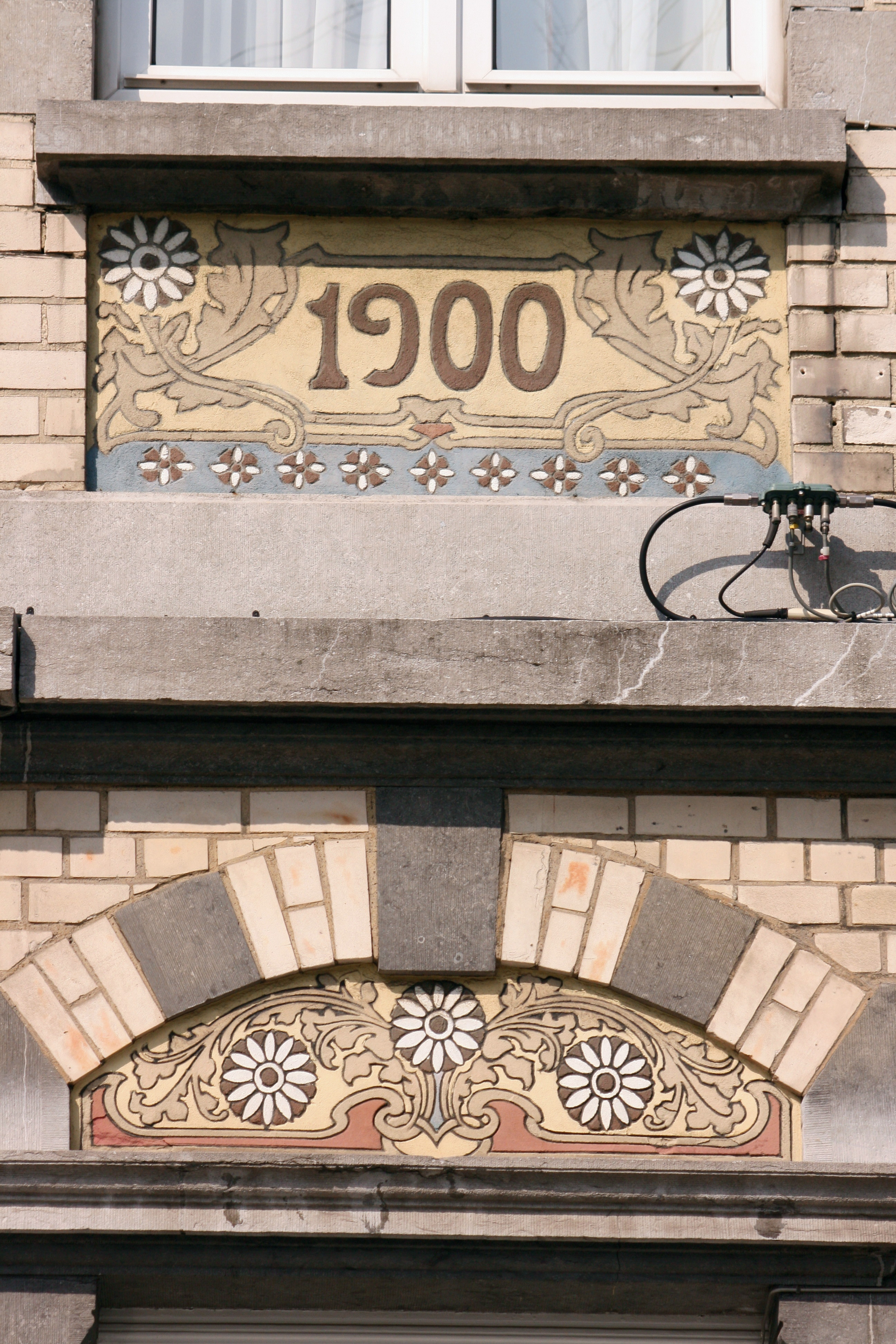
Art Nouveau sgraffito cartouche on Place Louis Morichar no. 10, Brussels, unknown artist, 1900

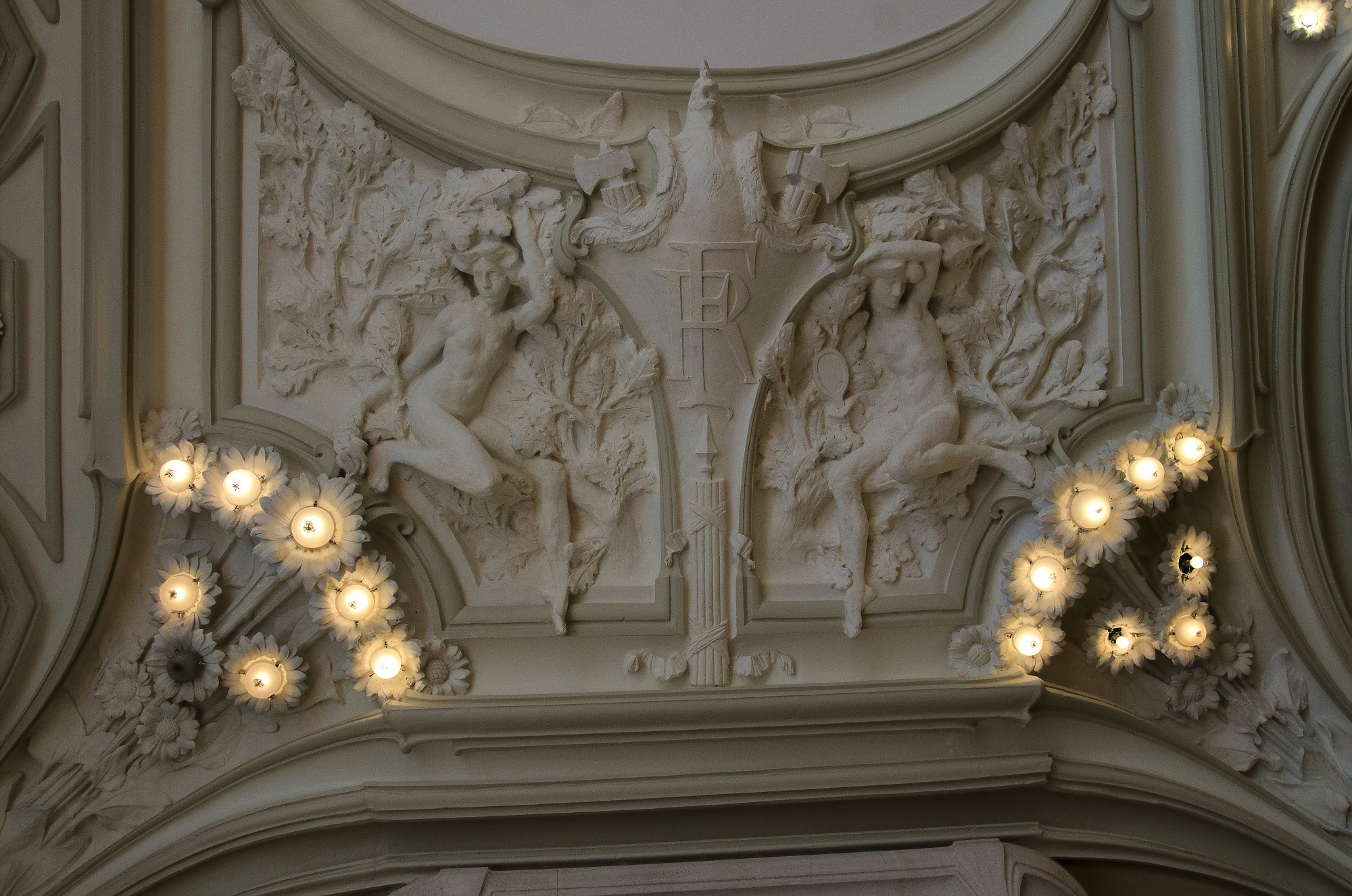
Stylized Art Nouveau cartouche with the RF monogram (which stands for Republique Française) on a ceiling of the Town Hall of Euville, France, by Henri Gutton, 1901-1909

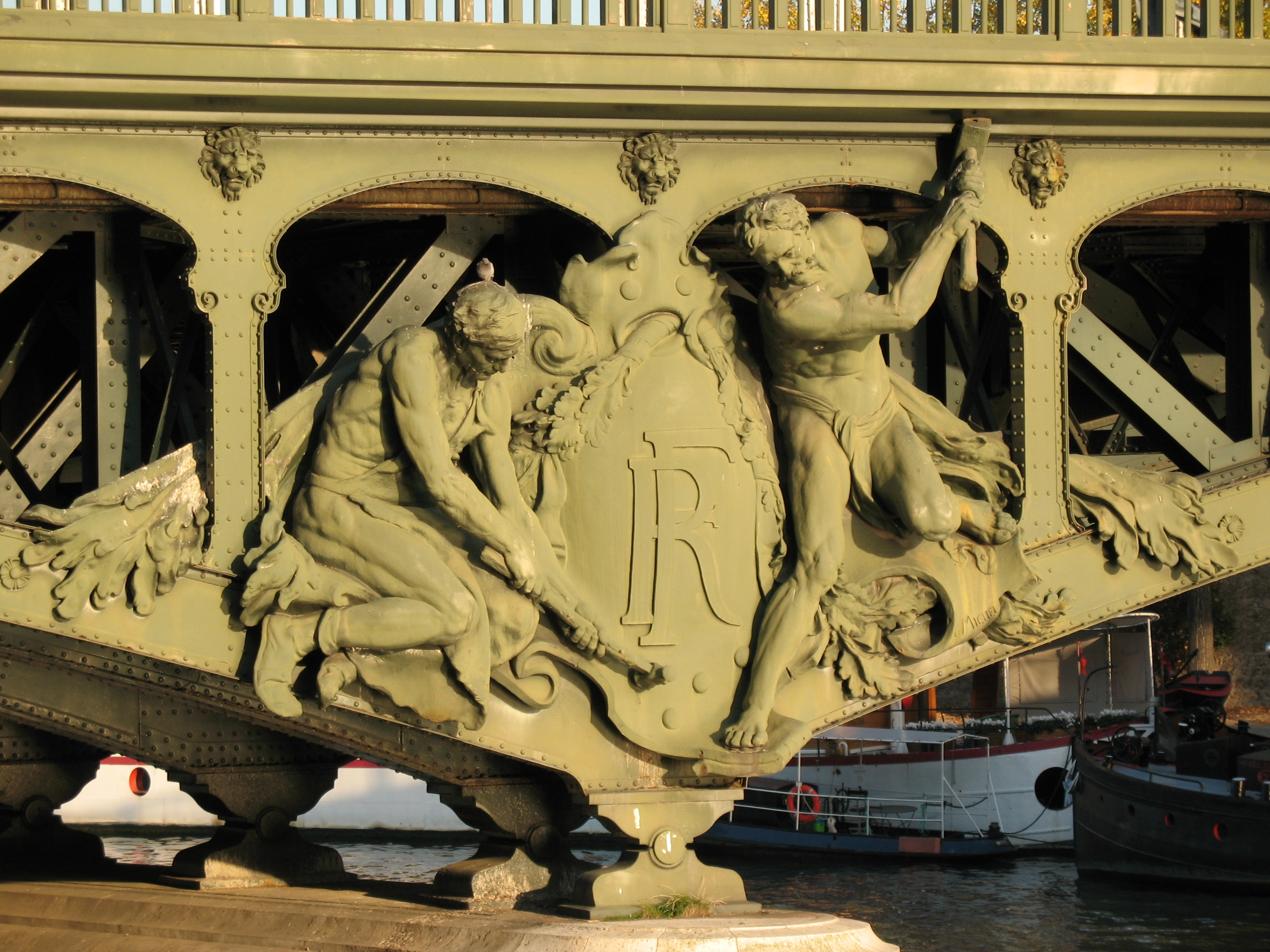
Beaux Arts cartouche of the Pont de Bir-Hakeim, Paris, by Jean Camille Formigé, Louis Biette and Daydé & Pillé, 1903-1905

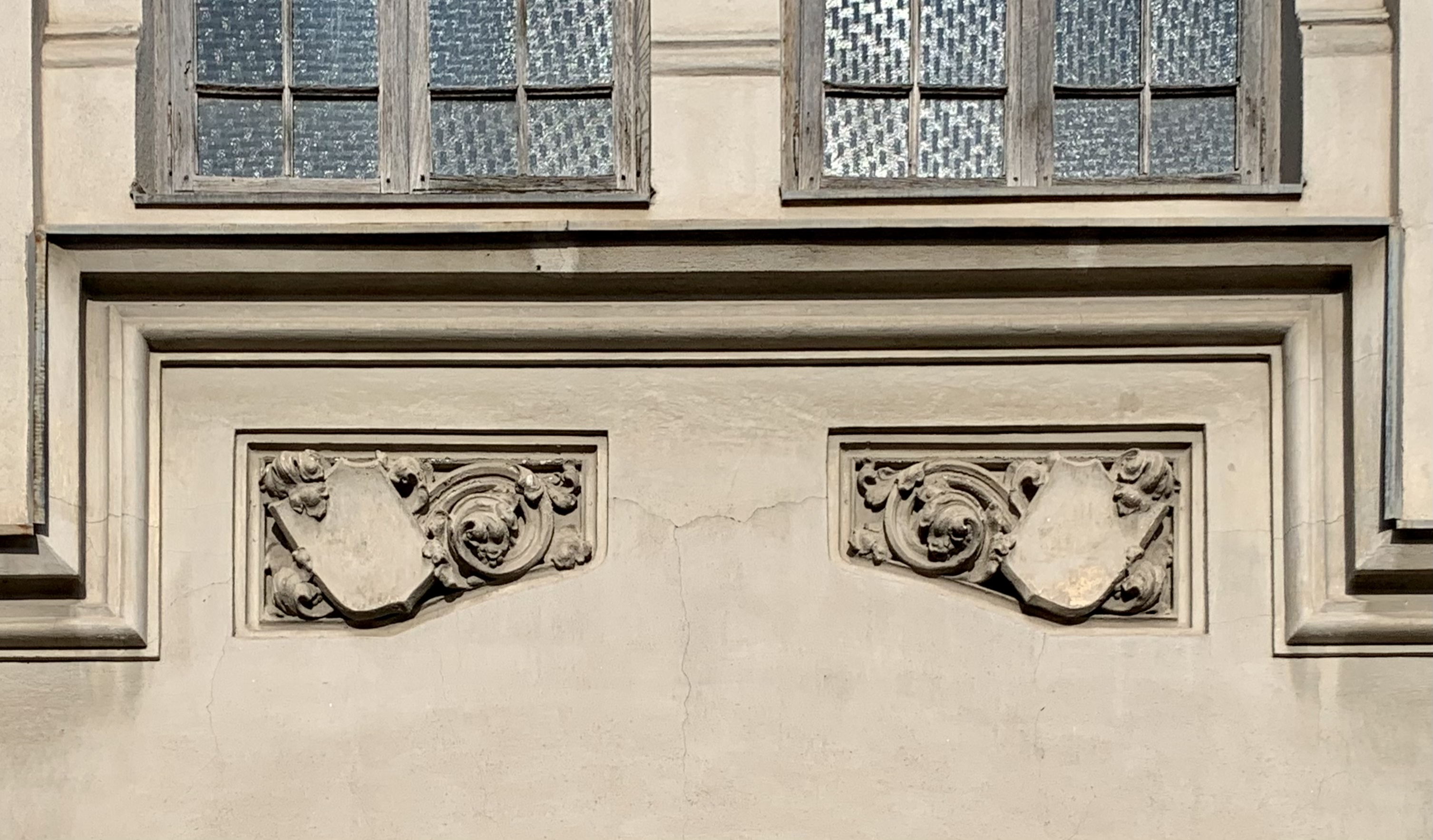
Gothic Revival shield-like cartouches on the Hermann I.Rieber carriage factory (Strada Romulus no. 17), Bucharest, by Siegfrid Kofczinsky, 1903

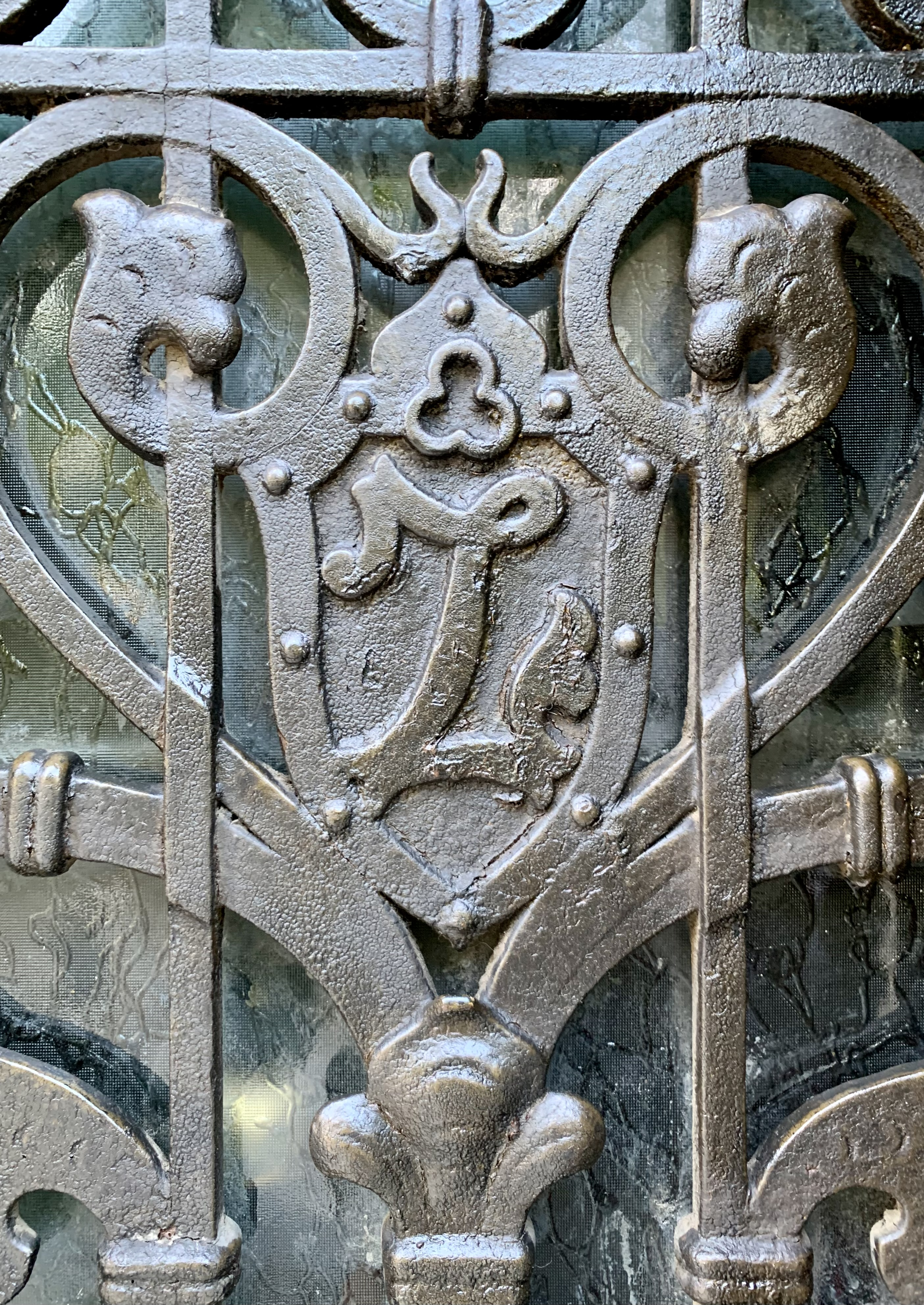
Gothic Revival cartouche with initial on a door of the Vasile Zottu House (Strada C.A. Rosetti no. 7), Bucharest, unknown architect, 1909

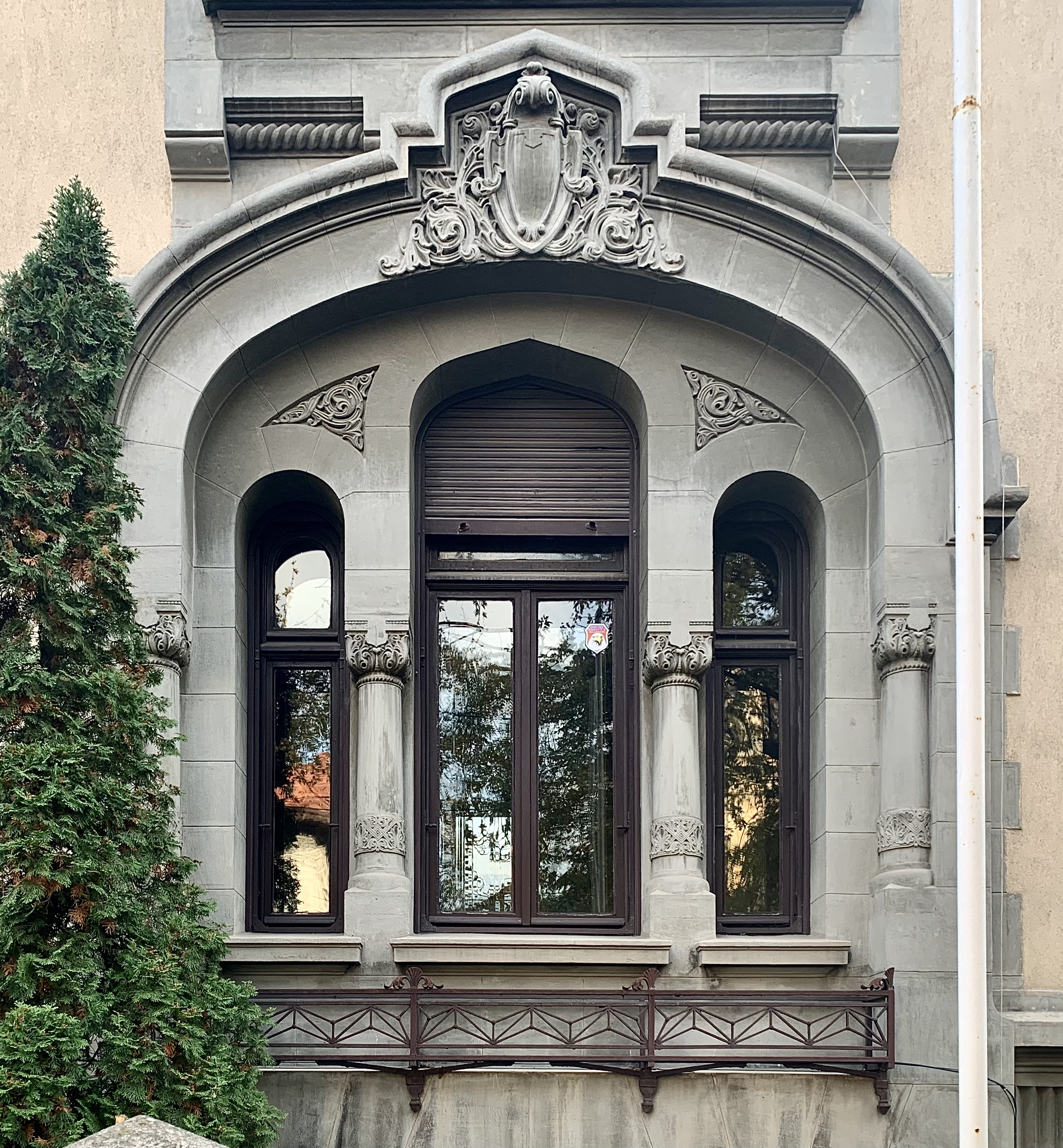
Romanian Revival cartouche above a window of the Aurel Mincu House (Bulevardul Dacia no. 60), Bucharest, by Arghir Culina, 1910

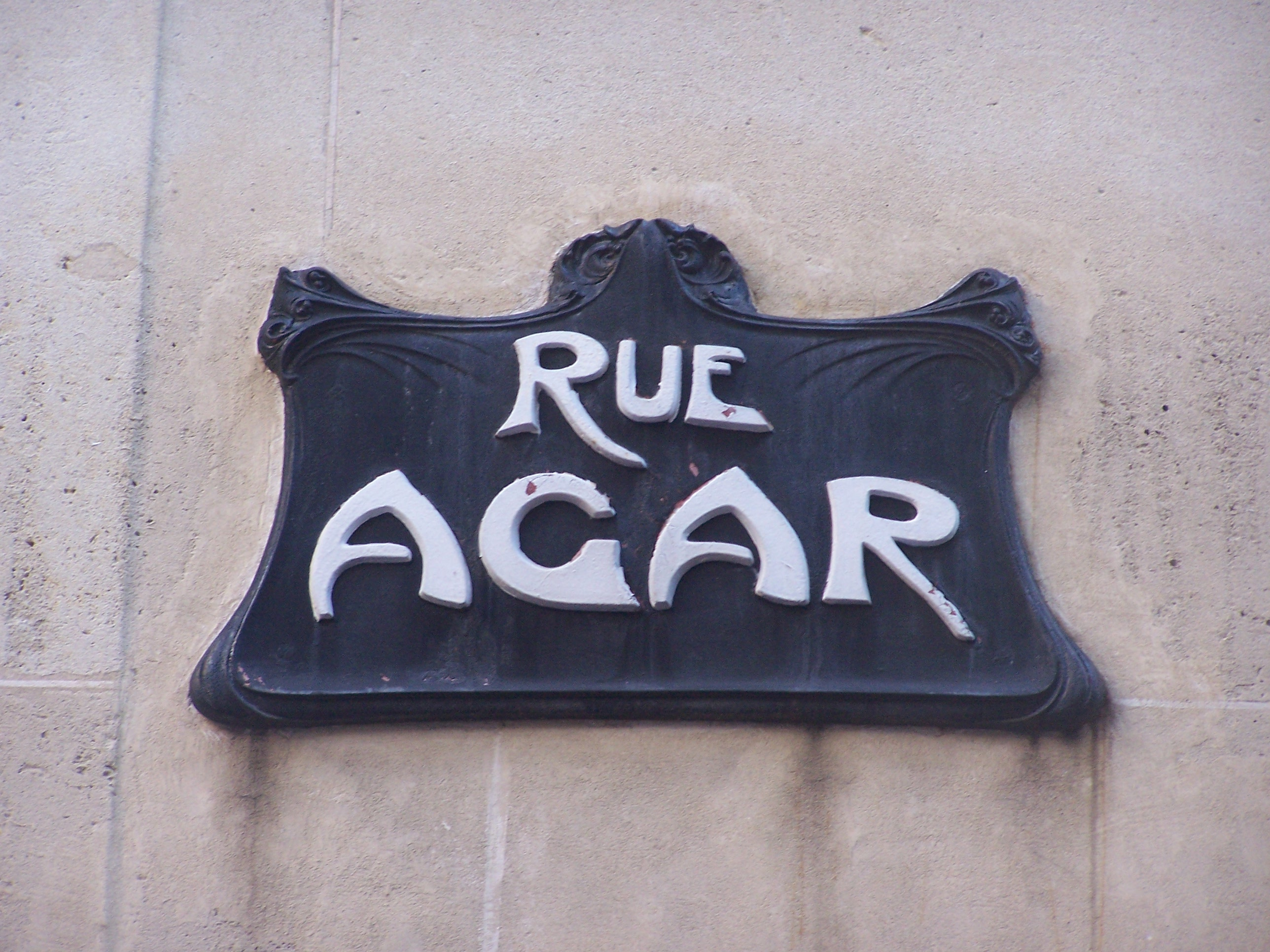
Highly stylized Art Nouveau cartouche on Rue Jean-de-La-Fontaine no. 21, Paris, by Hector Guimard, c.1911

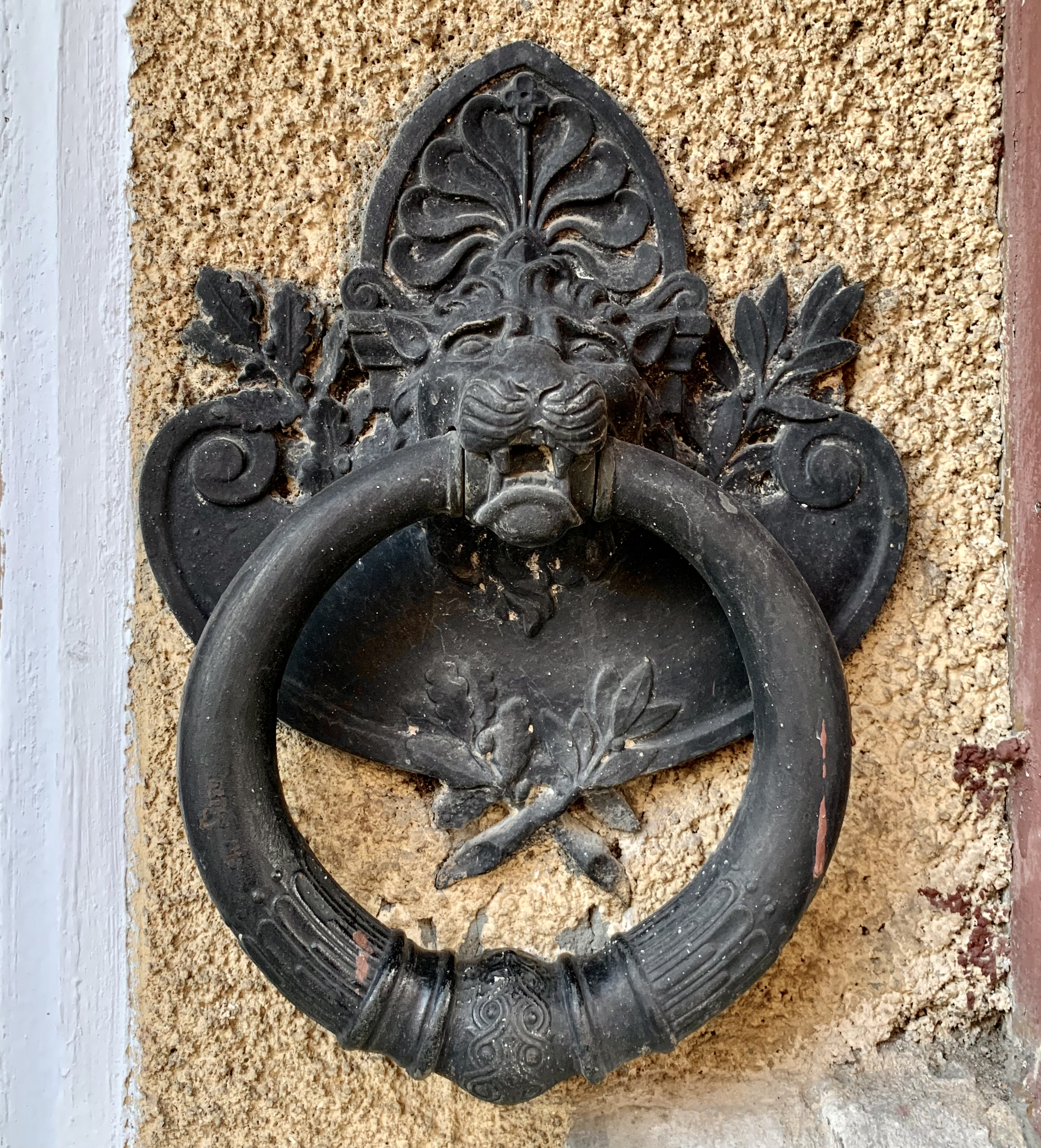
Greek Revival cartouche of a horse tie ring of the Adina and Emil Costinescu House (Strada Polonă no. 4), Bucharest, by Ion D. Berindey, 1911-1915

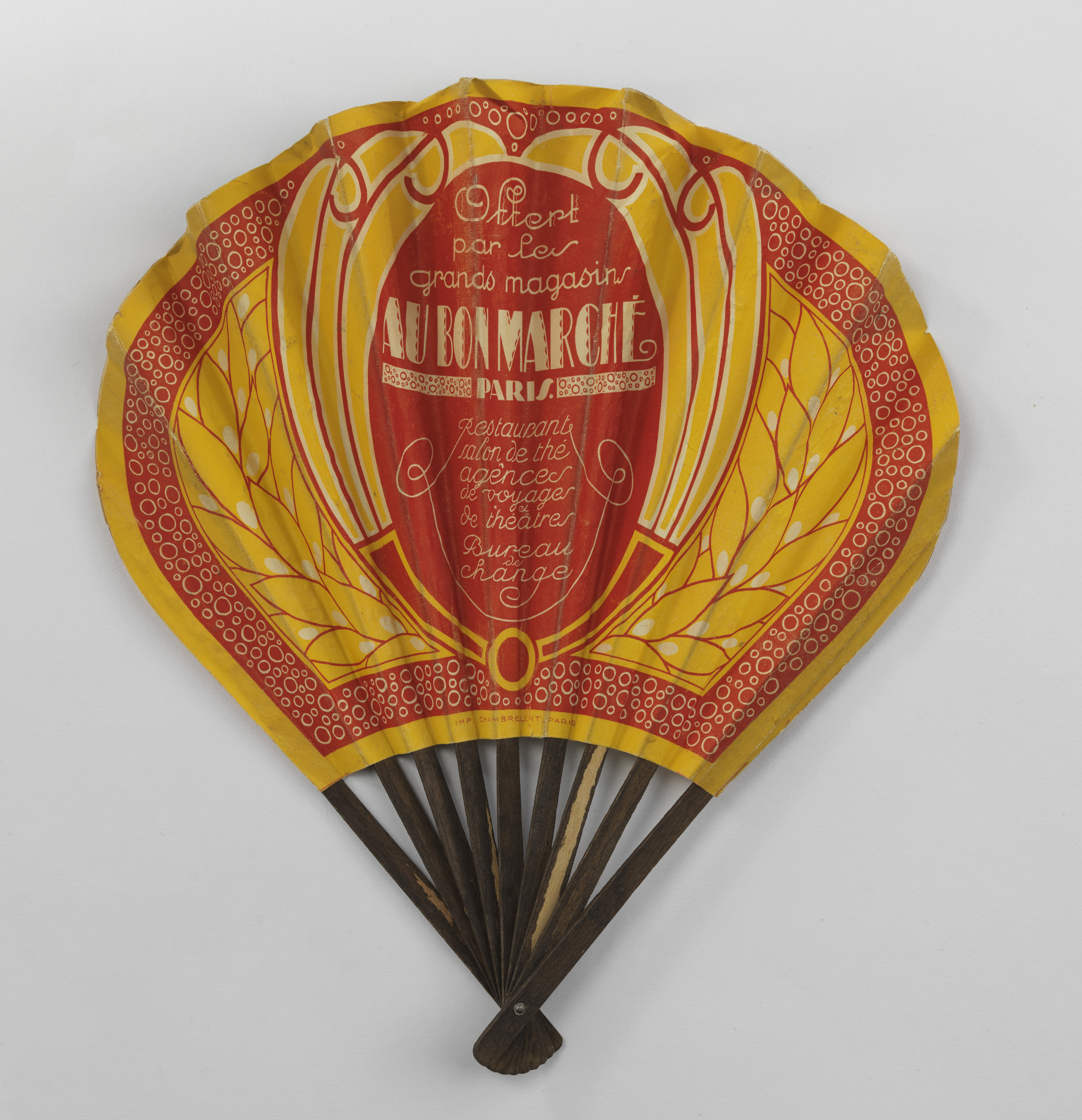
Art Deco cartouche on a fan, produced by Au Bon Marché, 1920-1925, vellum, stamping, wood, metal, and silver plating, Musée Galliera

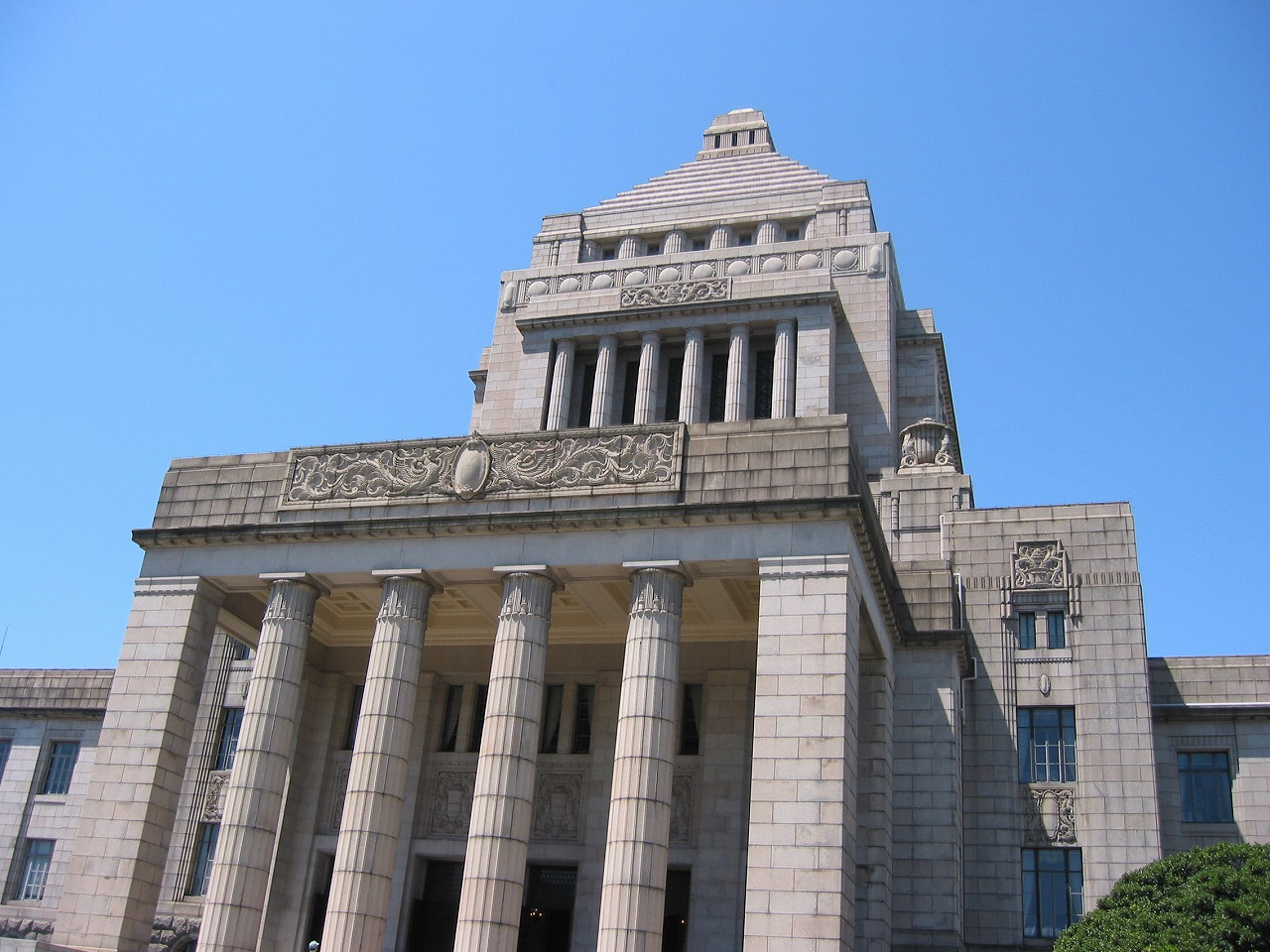
Art Deco cartouche above the entrance columns of the National Diet Building, Kyoto, by Fukuzo Watanabe, 1920-1936

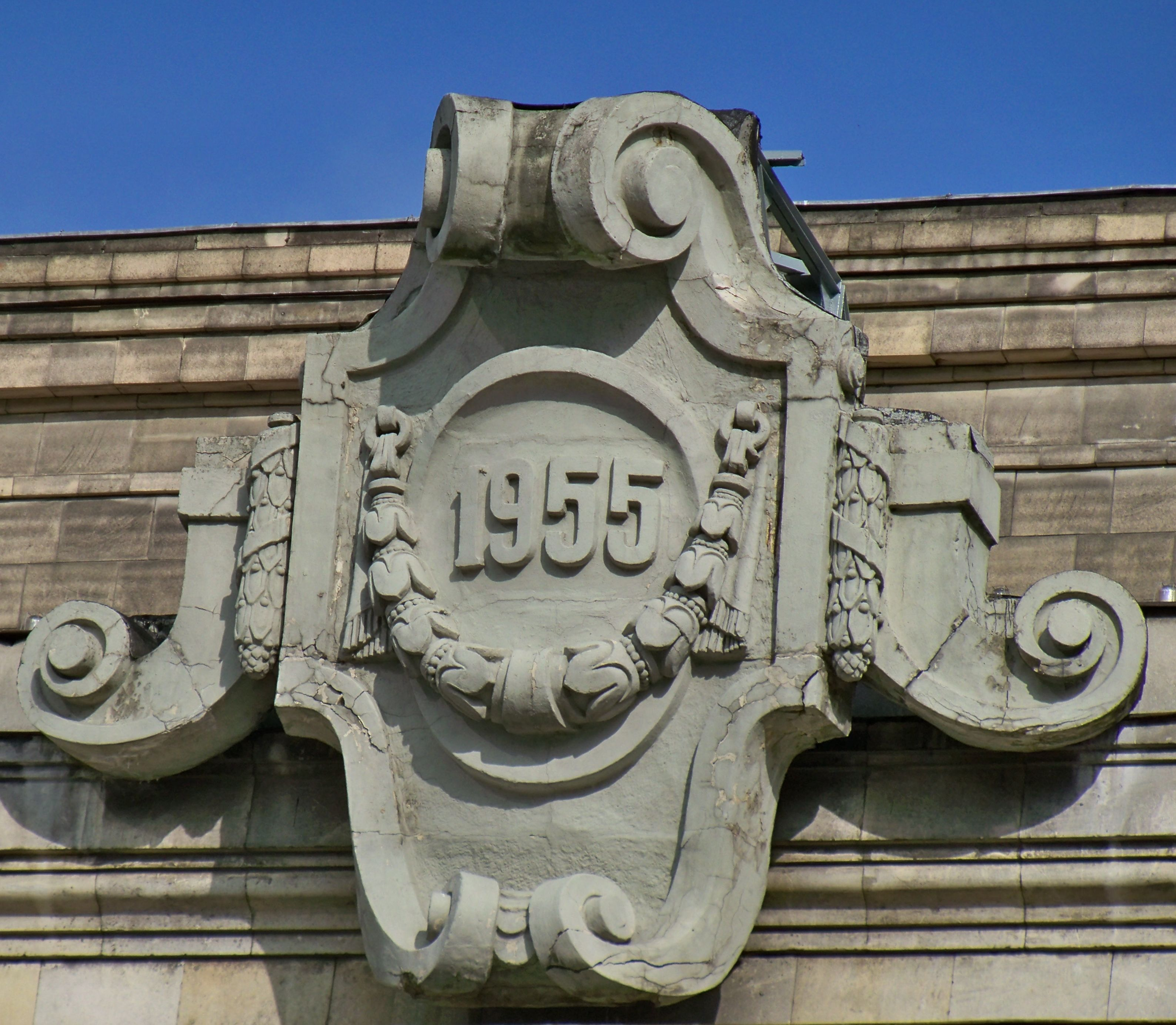
Stalinist cartouche of the Palace of Culture and Science, Warsaw, Poland, by Lev Rudnev, 1952-1955

=== Postmodernism and Retro reuses ===
At the end of the WW2, with the rise in popularity of the International Style, characterized by the complete lack of any ornamentation, led to the complete abandonment of any ornaments, including cartouches.

They reappear later in some Postmodernism, a movement that questioned Modernism (the status quo after WW2), and which promoted the inclusion of elements of historic styles in new designs. An early text questioning Modernism was by architect Robert Venturi, Complexity and Contradiction in Architecture (1966), in which he recommended a revival of the 'presence of the past' in architectural design. He tried to include in his own buildings qualities that he described as 'inclusion, inconsistency, compromise, accommodation, adaptation, superadjacency, equivalence, multiple focus, juxtaposition, or good and bad space.' Venturi encouraged 'quotation', which means reusing elements of the past in new designs. Part manifesto, part architectural scrapbook accumulated over the previous decade, the book represented the vision for a new generation of architects and designers who had grown up with Modernism but who felt increasingly constrained by its perceived rigidities. Multiple Postmodern architects and designers put simplified reinterpretations of the elements found in Classical decoration on their creations. However, they were in most cases highly simplified, and more reinterpretations than true reuses of the elements intended. Because of their complexity, cartouches were extremely rarely used in Postmodern architecture and design.

Cartouches enjoyed more popularity in Retro style of the 21st century, through designs inspired mainly by the 18th and 19th centuries.

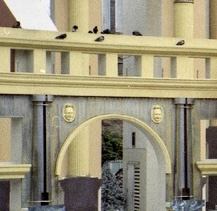
Postmodern mascarons in cartouches spilling water in Piazza d'Italia, New Orleans, USA, by Charles Moore, 1978

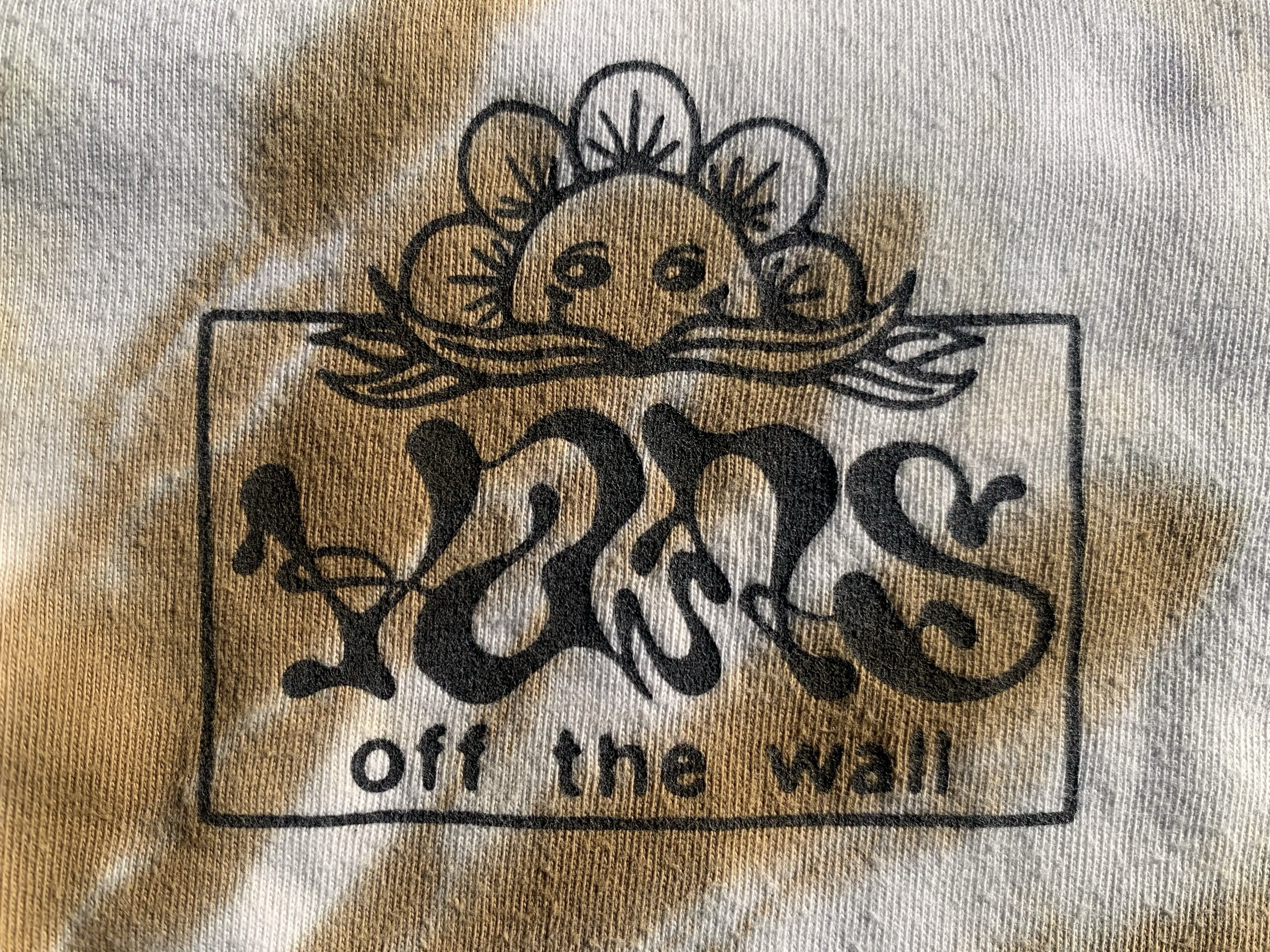
Cartouche with an Art Nouveau-inspired print on a Vans t-shirt, unknown fashion designer and illustrator, c.2021, print on textile

== See also ==
- Tondo (art): round (circular)
- Medallion (architecture): round or oval
- Architectural sculpture
- Cartouche (cartography)
- Cartouche (in Egyptian hieroglyphs)
- Resist: a technique in ceramics to highlight cartouches, etc.
- Console (heraldry)

== Footnotes ==
=== Works cited ===
- Hodge, Susie (2019). The Short Story of Architecture. Laurence King Publishing. ISBN 978-1-7862-7370-3.
- Hopkins, Owen (2014). Architectural Styles: A Visual Guide. Laurence King. ISBN 978-178067-163-5.
