= Sondern =

Sondern, meaning "But" in German, may refer to:

- Sondern (land division), a form of land division in the Middle Ages in Germany
- Sondern, Halver, a village in Halver, North Rhine-Westphalia, Germany
- Sondern, Olpe, a village in Olpe, in North Rhine-Westphalia, Germany
- Sondern, Radevormwald, a village in Radevormwald in North Rhine-Westphalia, Germany
- Sondern, Wuppertal, a village in Wuppertal-Beyenburg in North Rhine-Westphalia, Germany
