= Ernst Plassmann =

German-American sculptor and carver

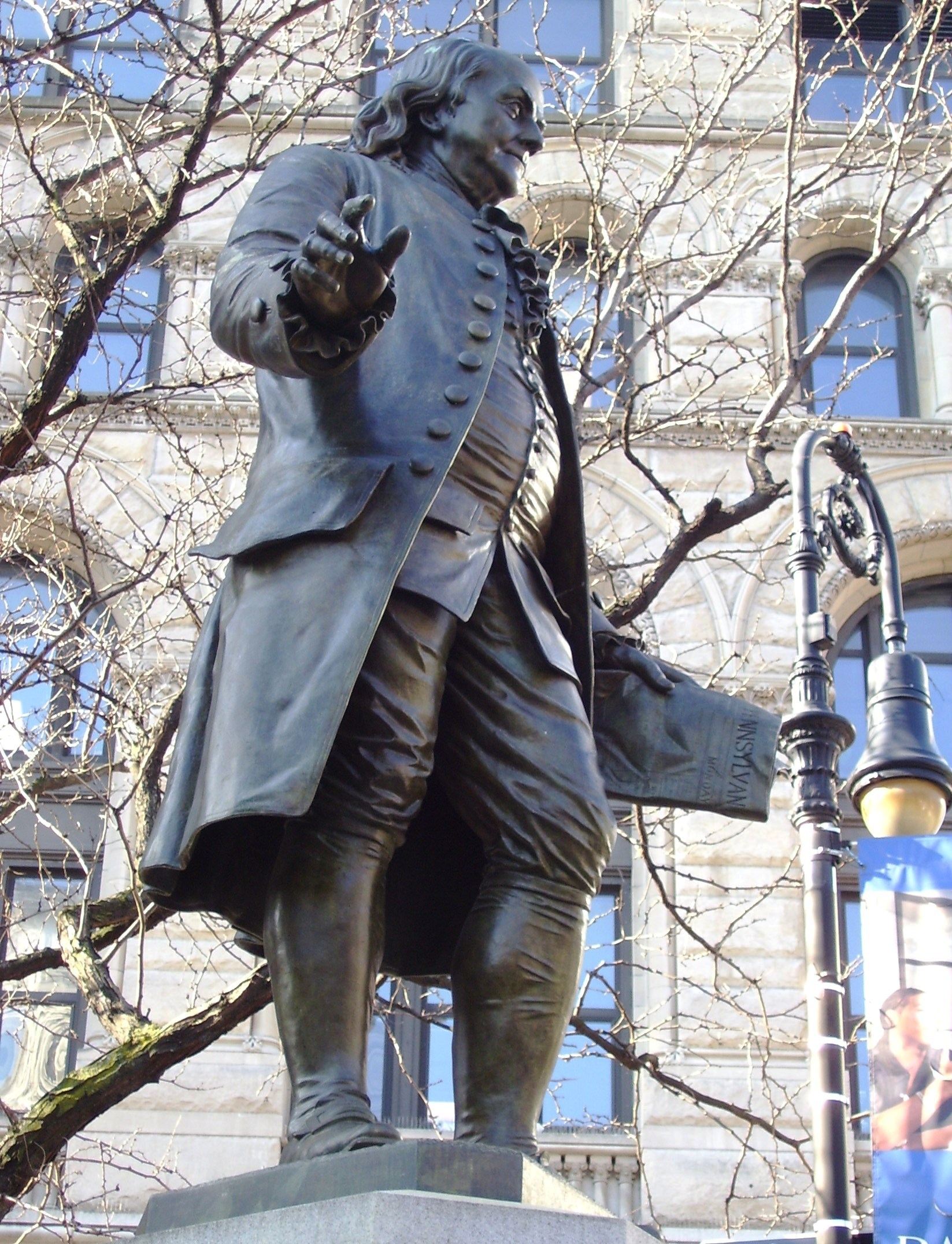
Plassmann's Franklin statue

Ernst Plassmann (14 June 1823 – 28 November 1877; alternate spelling, Plassman) was a German-American sculptor and carver.

== Biography ==
Born in Sondern, Wuppertal, Kingdom of Prussia, Plassmann began to study art under Munstermann, then continued his studies in Aachen, Cologne, and finally in Paris, where he spent about four years in the studio of Michel Liénard. He moved to New York City in 1853, and in 1854 established "Plassmann's School of Art", which he ran the rest of his life. In 1858 he founded the "Verein fur Kunst und Wissenschaft" (Association for Art and Science). In New York he became known for his statue of Benjamin Franklin (1870–1) in Printing House Square, depicted as a printer by including an issue of the Pennsylvania Gazette in his left hand. Plassmann spent months researching Franklin busts, portraits, and costumes, and he "labored conscientiously for several months" on the "colossal" clay statue, which was inaugurated on 17 January 1872.

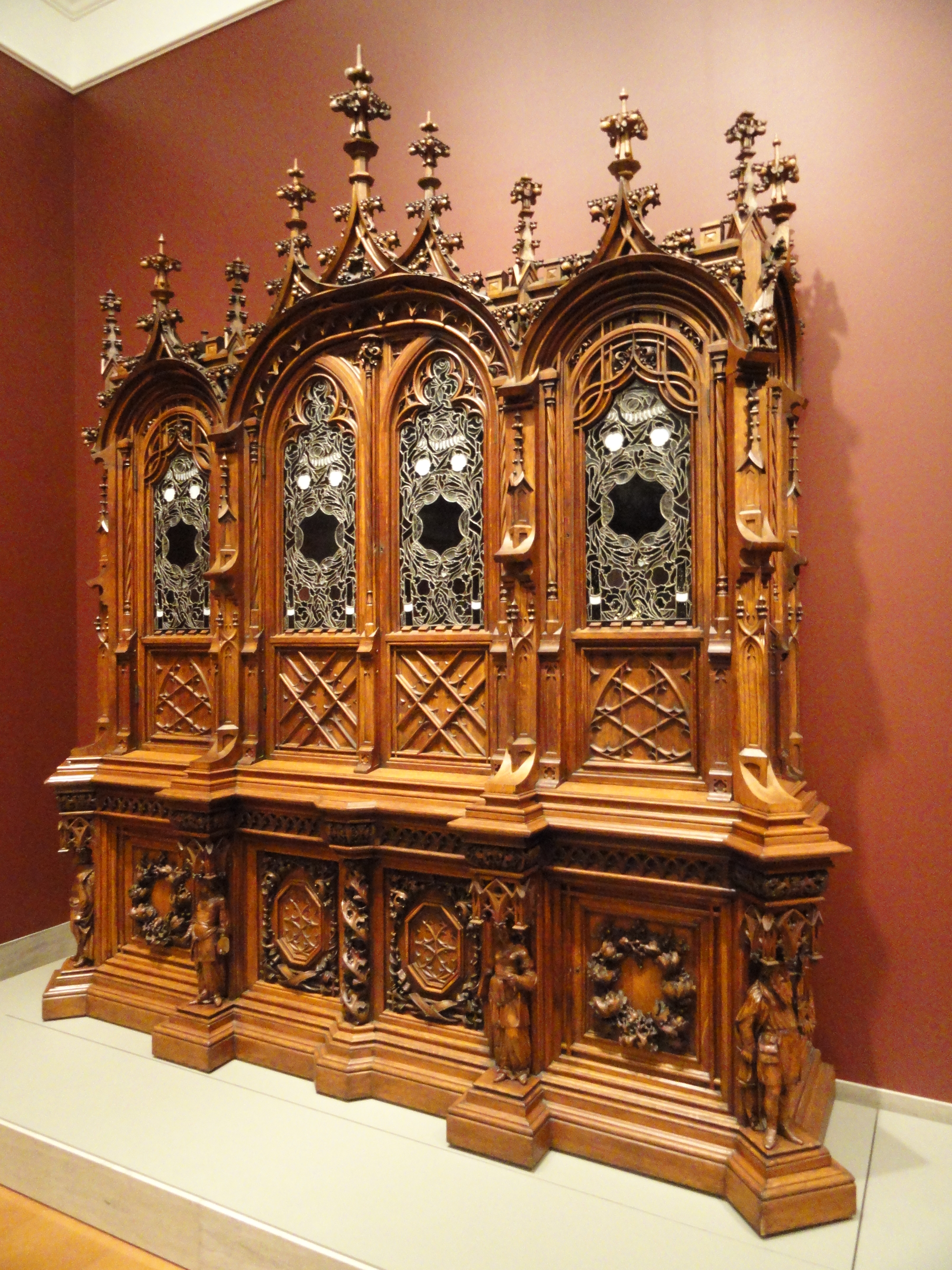
Bookcase (1852–1853) at the Nelson-Atkins Museum of Art -- Gustave Herter, designer; Bulkley and Herter, cabinetmaker; Plassman, carver

His figures of Franklin and Guttenberg are located on the New Yorker Staats-Zeitung building (c.1873). The heroic statue of Chief Tammany, a legendary Delaware Indian chief, was part of the façade of Tammany Hall on 14th Street (1868/9), while the 1869 8.5 feet (2.6 m) bronze statue of Cornelius Vanderbilt, the Commodore Vanderbilt, is located at the south façade of Midtown Manhattan's Grand Central Terminal. A Plassmann sculpture stands in the freight depot of the New York Central Railroad (1870), aside from various metal works, including medals. In 1875, he published Modern Gothic Ornaments with 83 plates. He began publishing Designs for Furniture in 1877, and had completed three parts by the time of his death (in New York City).

== Selected works ==
- (1875) A collection of modern Gothic ornaments for architects, sculptors, modelers, designers, painters, &c., &c.
- (1877) Designs for furnitures and development,
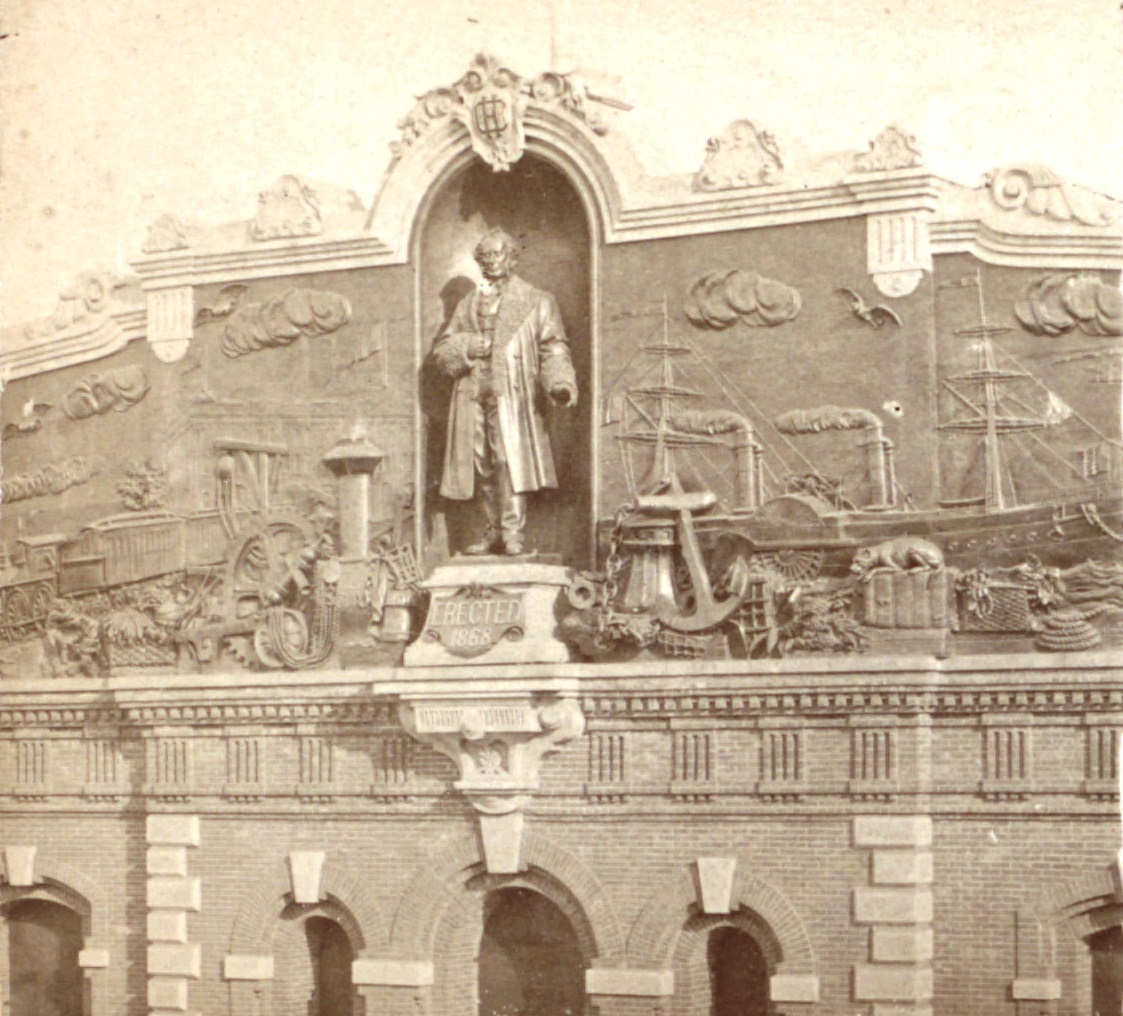
Cornelius Vanderbilt pediment (1868), Hudson River Railway Freight Depot. Demolished.

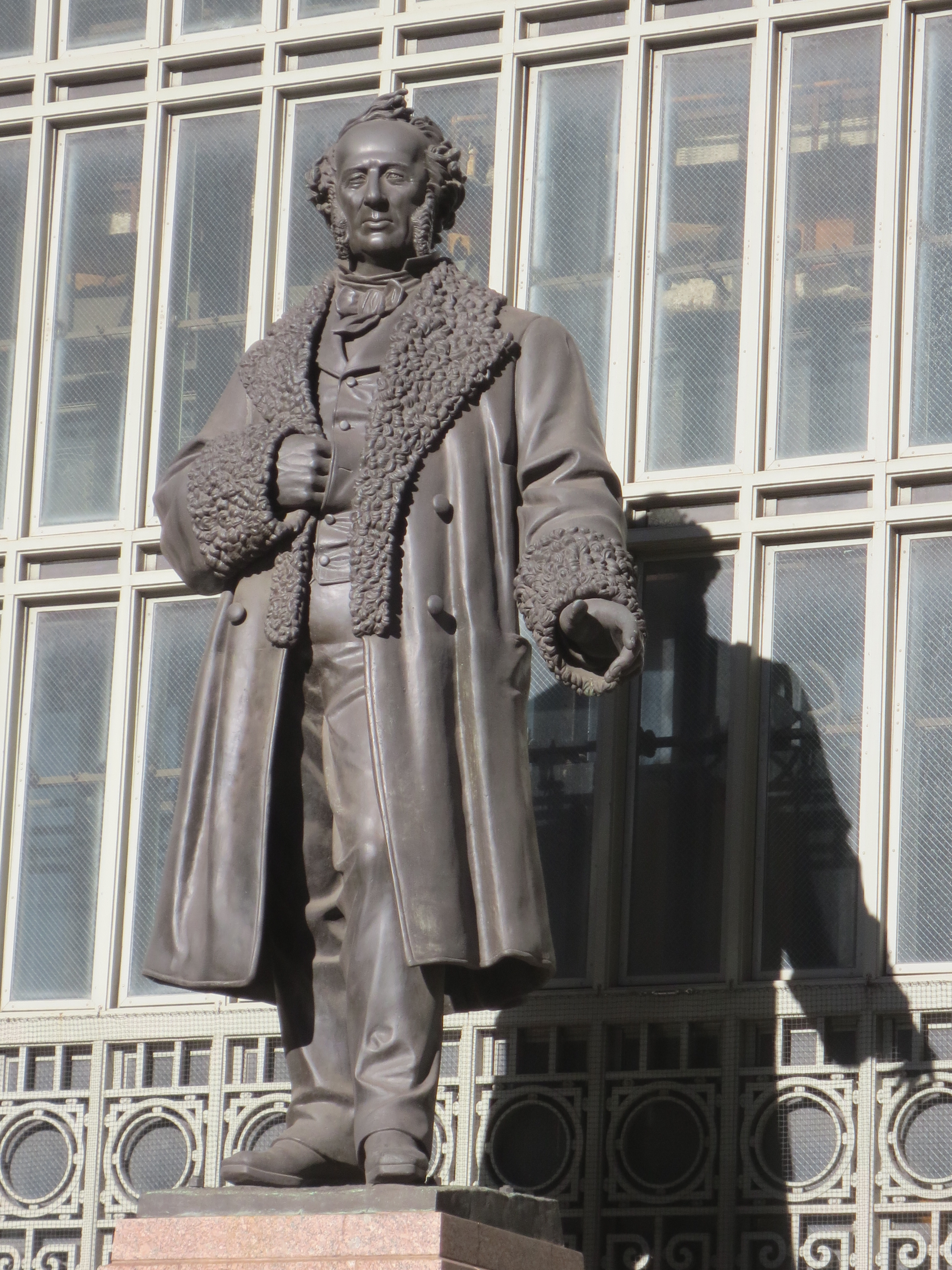
Commodore Vanderbilt (1868), relocated to Grand Central Terminal, 1929.

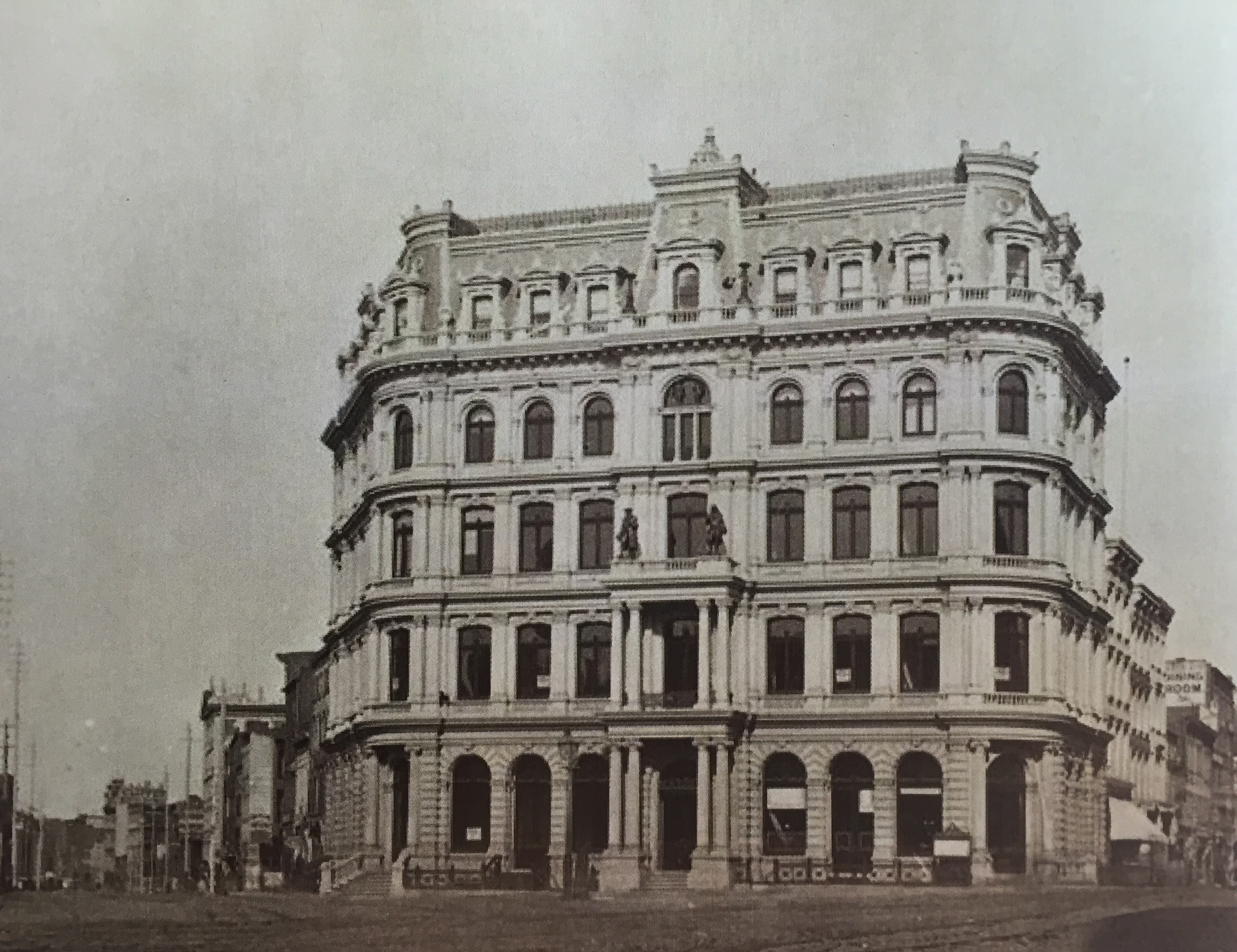
Staats-Zeitung Building (c. 1873). Demolished for construction of the approach to the Brooklyn Bridge.

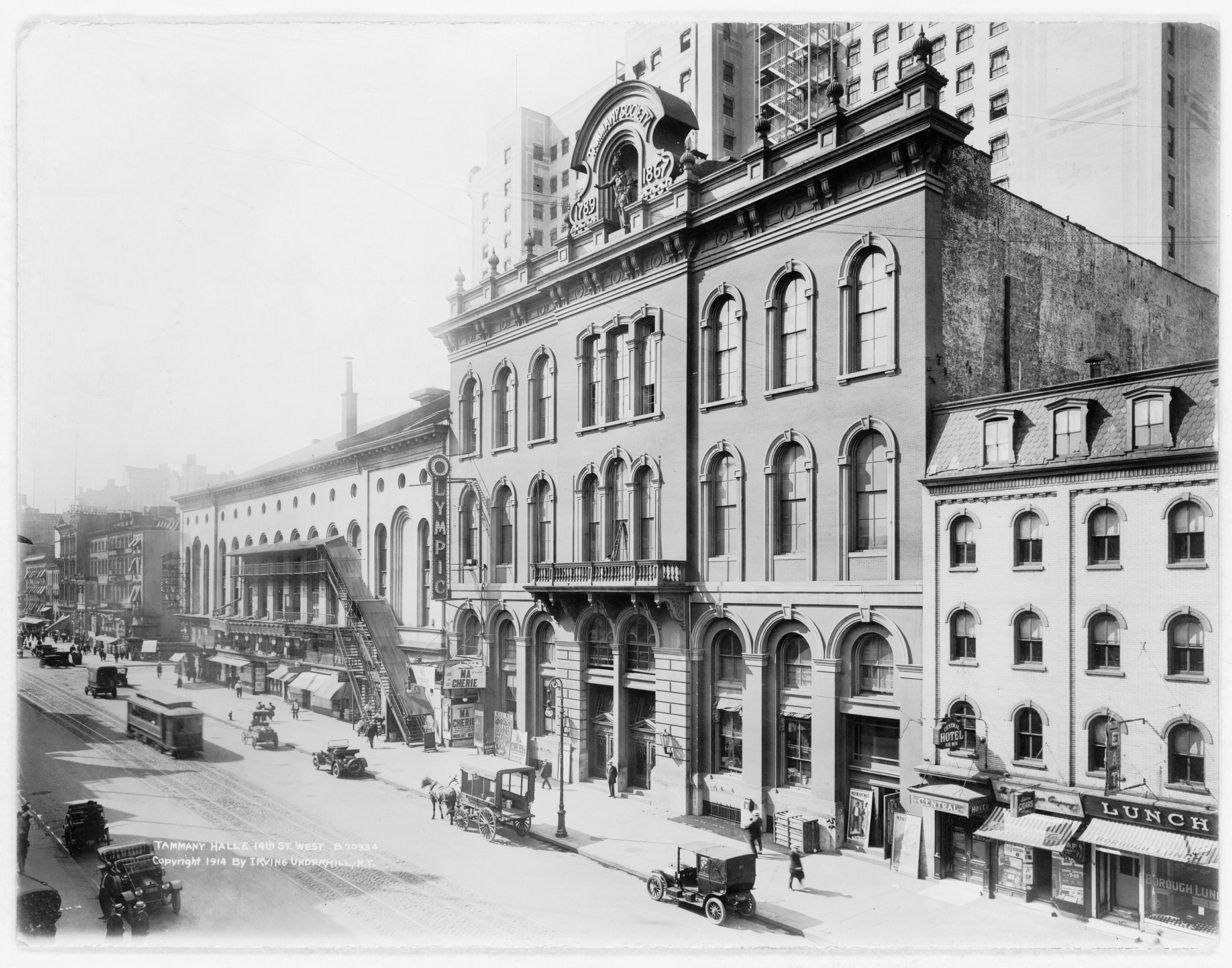
Tammany Hall, West 14th Street, NYC
