= Grand Central Terminal art =

Railroad station art

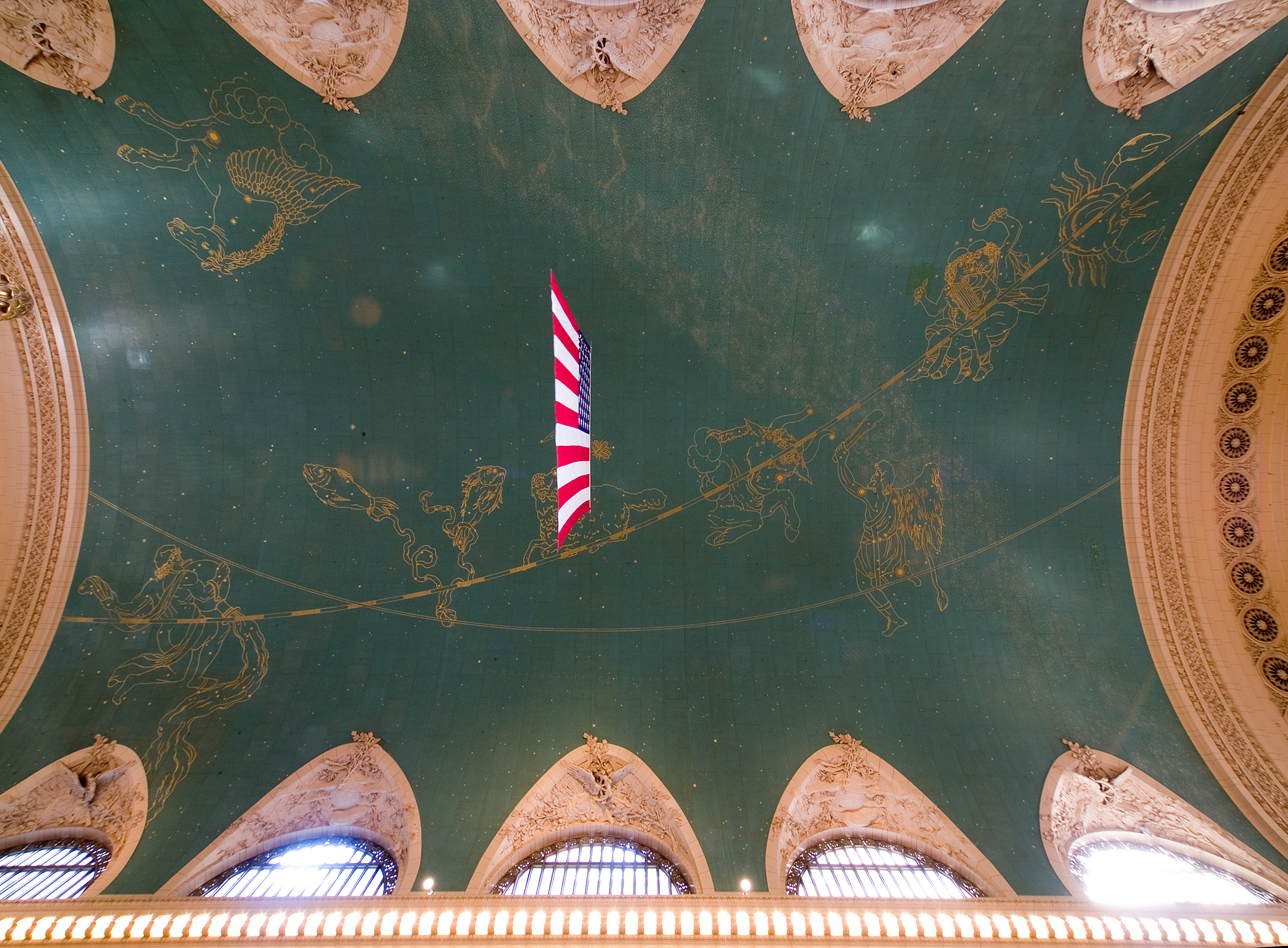
The Main Concourse ceiling, conceived by Whitney Warren and Paul César Helleu

Grand Central Terminal, one of the main railroad stations in New York City, features public art by a variety of artists. Through its status as a transportation and architectural icon, the terminal has also been depicted in many works of art.

Grand Central features permanent works of art, including the celestial ceiling in the Main Concourse, the Glory of Commerce work and the statue of Cornelius Vanderbilt in front of the building's south facade, and the two cast-iron eagle statues adorning the terminal's facades. As well, Vanderbilt Hall is regularly used for temporary art exhibitions and events. The Dining Concourse has a series of lightboxes also used to display temporary art exhibits. The terminal is also known for its performance and installation art, including flash mobs and other spontaneous events.

== Artwork on display or part of the terminal ==
=== Facade ===
==== Glory of Commerce ====
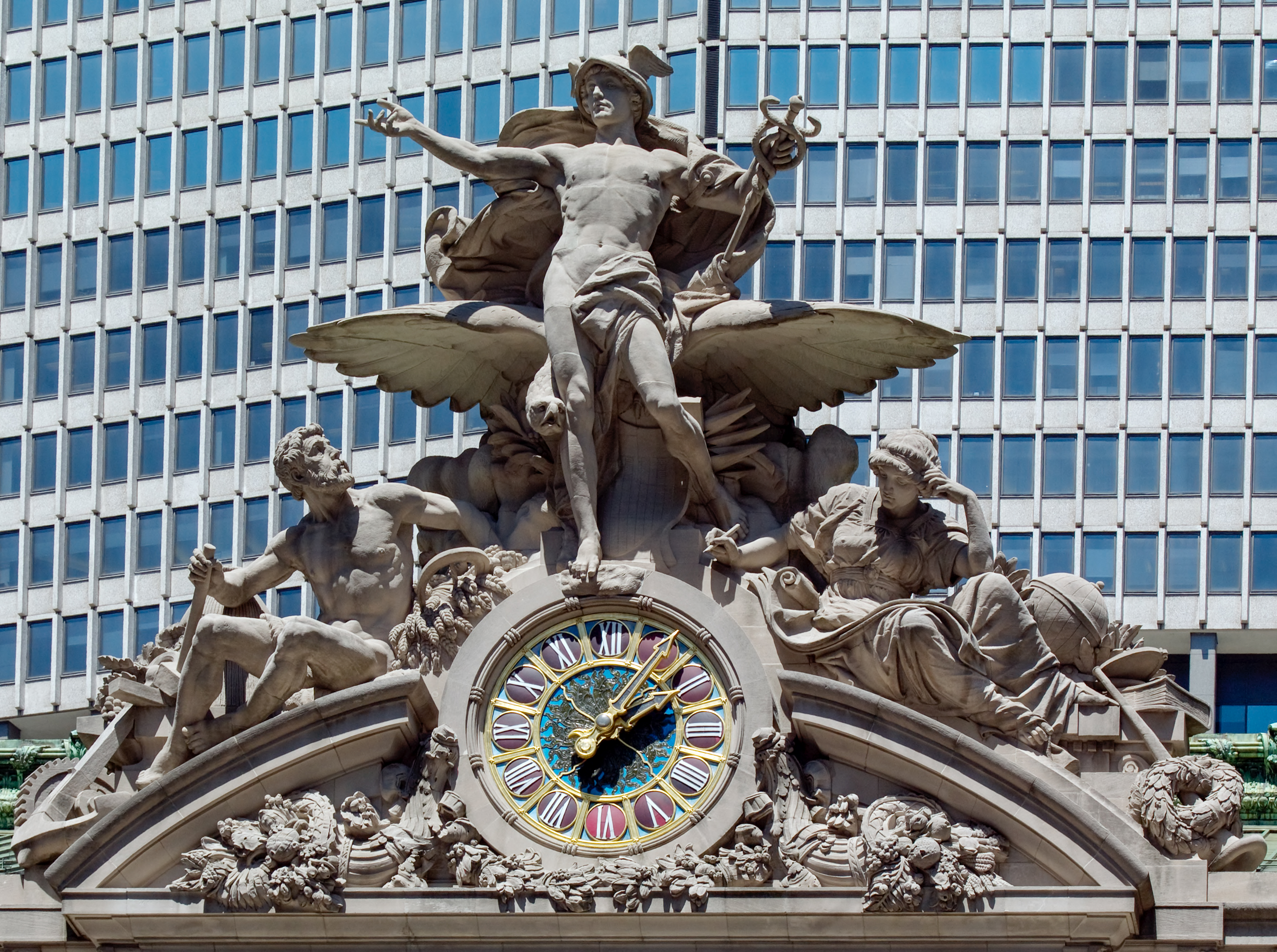
Glory of Commerce, a sculptural group by Jules-Félix Coutan

The Glory of Commerce sculptural group rests atop the terminal's facade, directly above a broken pediment featuring a large clock. The work is also known as Progress with Mental and Physical Force or Transportation. It is about 48 feet (15 m) tall, 66 feet (20 m) wide, and weighs about 1,500 short tons (1,400 t). At its unveiling in 1914, the work was considered the largest sculptural group in the world.

The work includes representations of Minerva, Hercules, and Mercury. The sculptures were designed by French sculptor Jules-Félix Coutan and carved by the John Donnelly Company. Coutan created the model in his Paris studio and shipped it to New York City later.

Mercury is standing at the top center of the work, depicted traditionally with a caduceus and wearing a winged helmet, with loose drapery concealing otherwise complete nudity. He is standing in a contrapposto pose in front of an eagle, wings outstretched, peering around his right leg. Two other gods are depicted to Mercury's left and right: the male figure to his right is typically and officially deemed to be Hercules, though he lacks the god's characteristic club and lionskin. Instead, the god is depicted among an anchor, cogwheel, anvil and hammer, a beehive, grapes, wheat ears and a sickle. Many of these are symbols of Vulcan, who is depicted with Minerva and Mercury in other works. He is also nearly naked, staring at Mercury above him. The female figure, Minerva, is resting her head on her left arm, looking down at a roll of parchment on her lap. She is depicted among a globe, a measuring compass, volumes of books and thick wreaths of laurel.

The work is seen as attempting to fulfill several goals: portraying the terminal itself as a new technology, representing the Vanderbilt family, and serving as an artistic piece to parallel European art and architecture of the time.

==== Clock ====
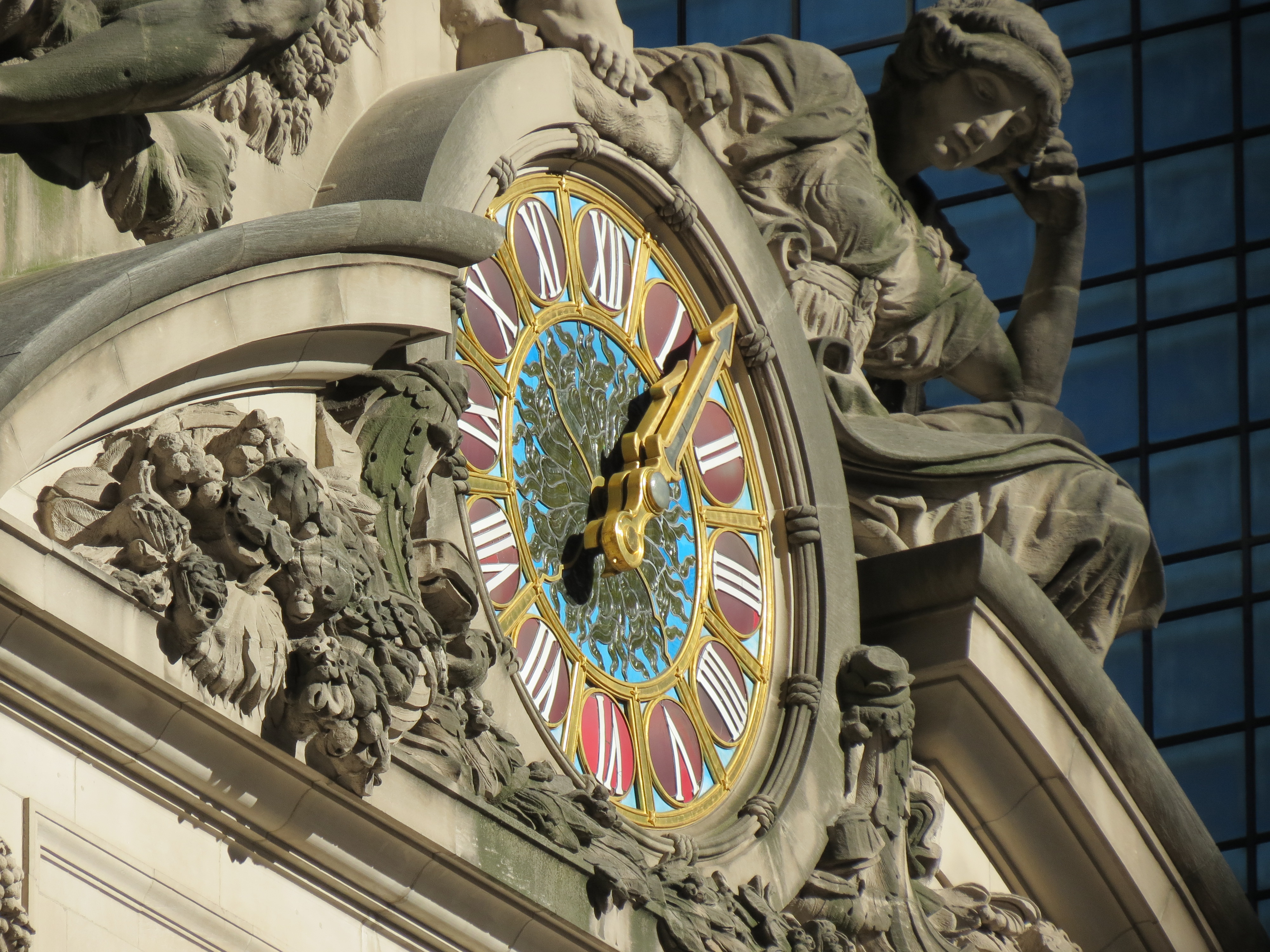
Clock detail

There is a 13-foot-wide (4.0 m) clock on top of the south facade. It was installed in 1914 by the Self Winding Clock Company. The clock face has decorative stained glass framed in bronze, with cast-iron clock hands, the latter weighing 340 lbs. The center of the clock features a circular panel with a sunburst design. The glass work also features twelve Roman numerals to designate the time; its numeral "IIII" is traditional for clock faces displaying the number four, instead of the more common "IV". The numeral "VI", on the bottom of the clock, hides a flap that is used for maintenance. The clock mechanics are accessed via several ladders, reached from a door in the Operations Control Center. Access requires security clearance, limiting the number of visitors; these select few traditionally write their names on the clock room walls in permanent markers.

The clock has a "Tiffany-style" design. Despite modern sources describing the clock as a work of Tiffany Studios or Tiffany & Co., the work is unsigned, and the latter company could not confirm the claim. Most sources that describe the clock in detail do not label it a Tiffany piece, and books published by the Tiffany companies make no mention of the clock. Tiffany Studios was employed to create metalwork for the terminal in the 1900s, though clockwork and glass were attributed to numerous other contractors.

==== Statue of Cornelius Vanderbilt ====
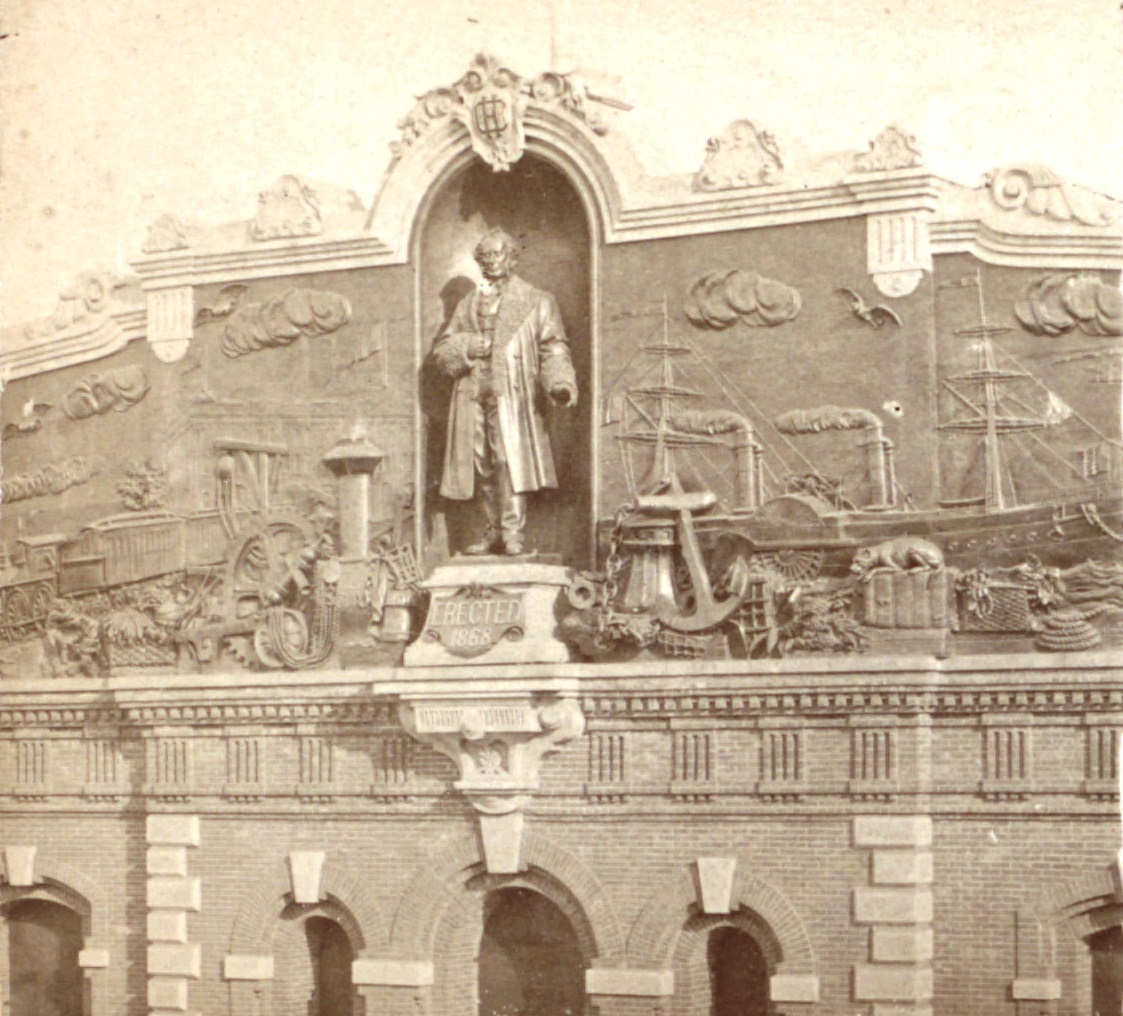
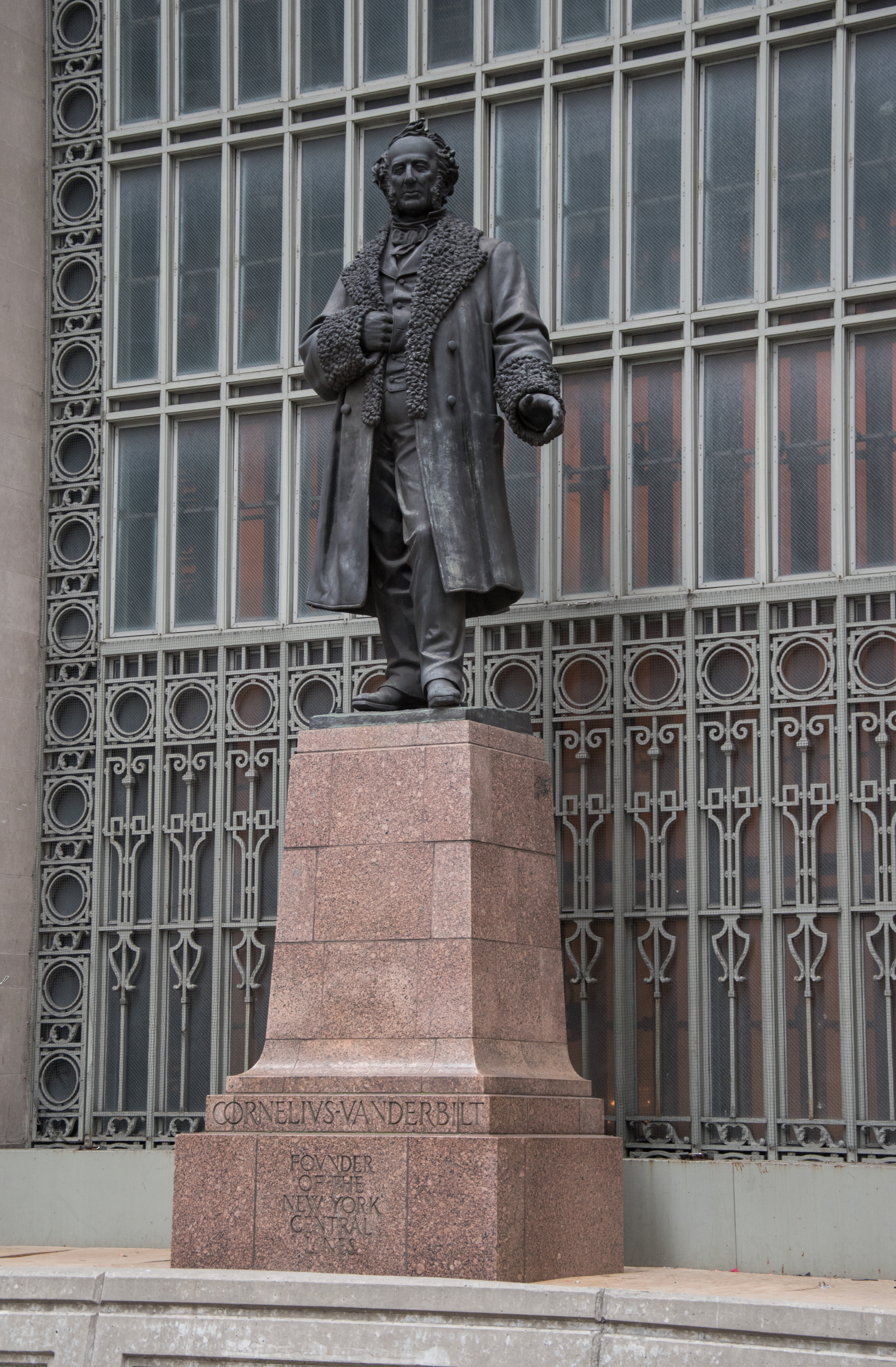
Cornelius Vanderbilt statue by Ernst Plassmann
Original location, Hudson River Railway Freight Depot (left) and current location at Grand Central (right)

A statue of Cornelius Vanderbilt, longtime owner of the New York Central, stands at the center of the terminal's south facade, directly below its clock and facing the Park Avenue Viaduct. The work was sculpted by Ernst Plassmann, and is of bronze, 8.5 feet (2.6 m) tall and weighing 4 tons, with a 9-foot-tall granite pedestal. It depicts Vanderbilt bareheaded and in his commonly-seen winter clothes, including a heavy double-breasted and fur-trimmed overcoat. He is posed in a noble way, described as Jeffersonian, with one hand on his chest and another outstretched. It was the largest bronze statue cast in the United States at the time.

The statue was created as part of a bronze bas-relief on the facade of the Hudson River Railroad depot at St. John's Park in the present-day neighborhood of Tribeca. The bas-relief was 150-foot (46 m) long and depicted various components of Vanderbilt's life, including his steamships and trains. The relief and statue were generally designed by Albert De Groot, a steamship captain under Vanderbilt, though they were sculpted by Plassmann.

Unveiled and dedicated in November 1869, the works received much criticism from newspapers and other writers; the New York Times said such a tribute ought to include "the dismembered bodies of men, women and children" killed in the New York Central's open railyards to the north.

This criticism may have convinced Vanderbilt to abandon his plans for another statue of himself, to have been installed at Grand Central Depot, which was built in 1871. The planned statue was to have been part of a grouping designed by De Groot with a sailor at one side and Native American at the other.

In 1929, Plassmann's statue was moved to Grand Central Terminal. Once again, it received criticism in the press.

==== Eagles ====
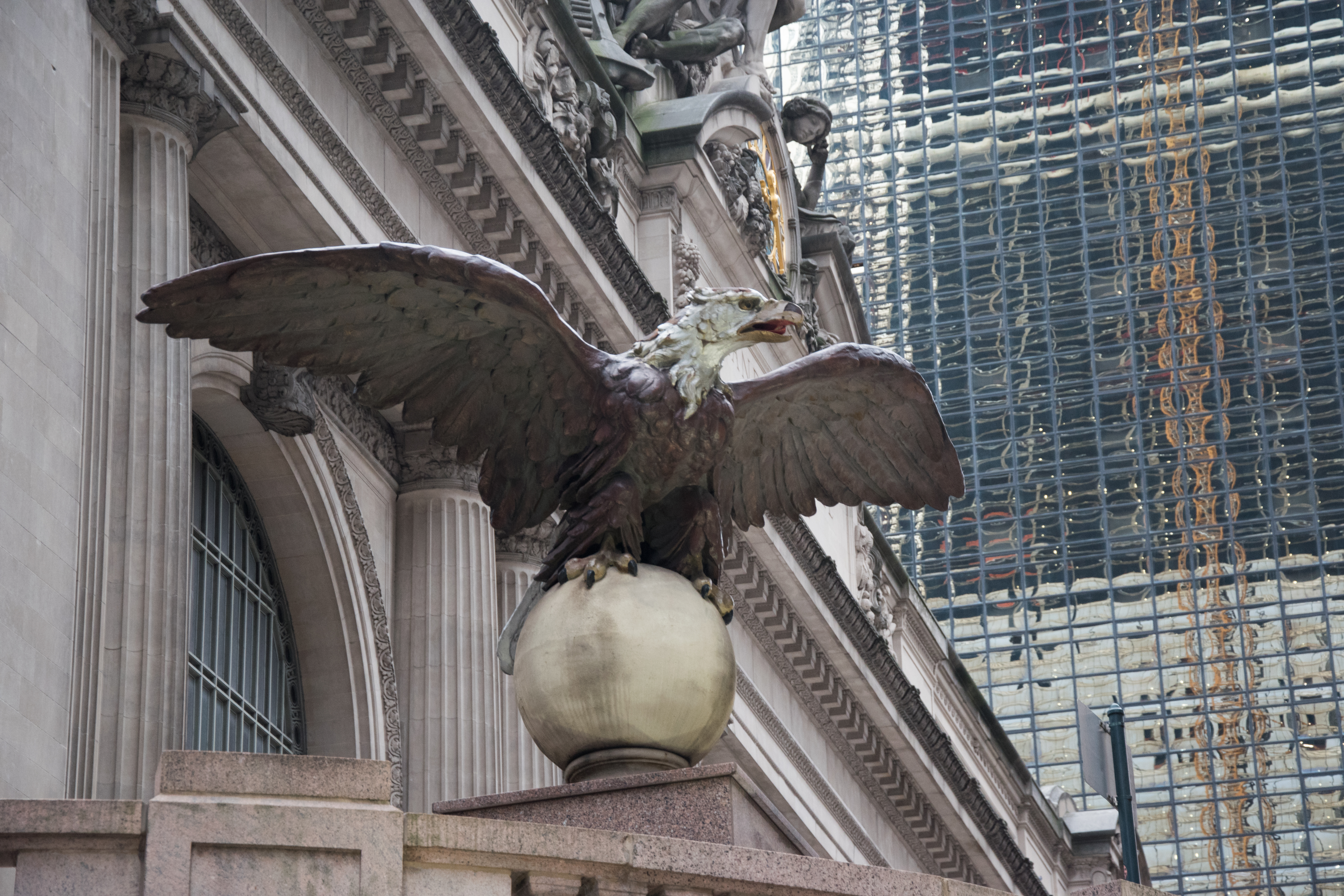
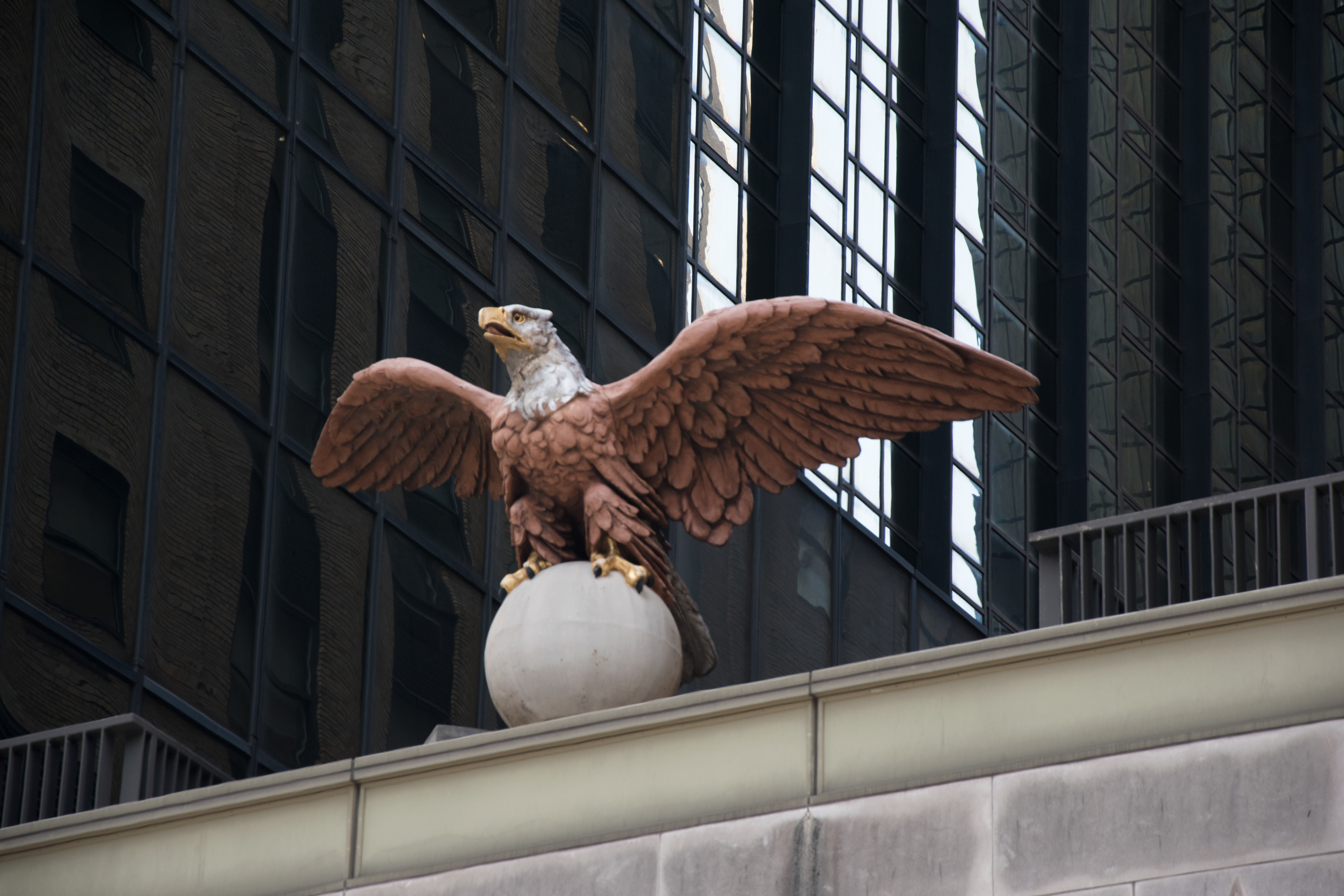
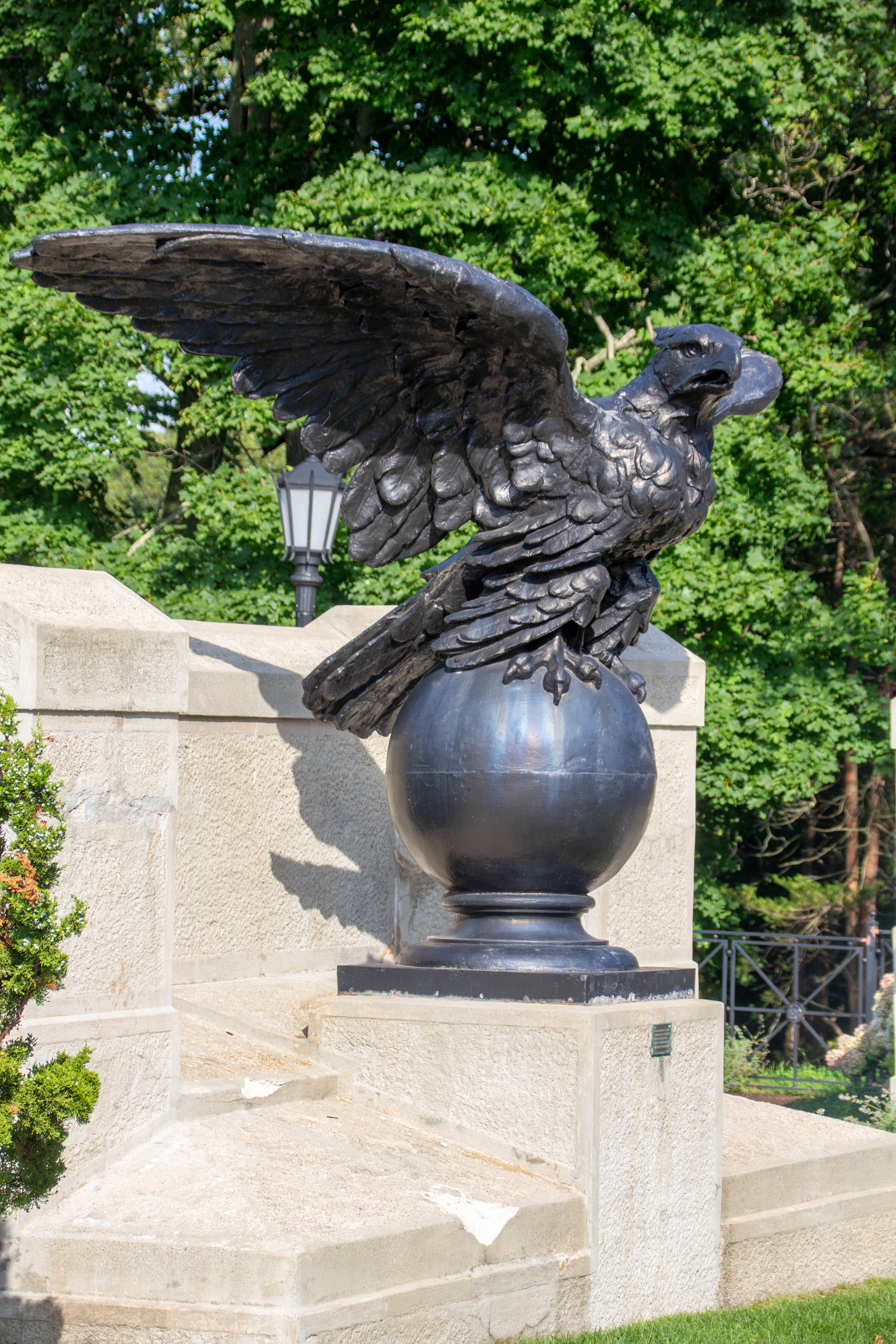
The eagle now over Grand Central Terminal (left), over Grand Central Market (middle) and at the Vanderbilt Museum (right)

Grand Central Terminal has two cast-iron eagle statues on display. The eagles weigh about 4,000 pounds (1,800 kg) each, have a wingspan of about 13 feet (4.0 m), and are perched on stone spheres.

They are two of the 11 or 12 eagle statues that ornamented the terminal's predecessor, Grand Central Station. In 1910, when the station was demolished to build Grand Central Terminal, the eagles were dispersed throughout the city and New York state. By 1913, two were at the Philipse Manor station in Sleepy Hollow, New York, one was on the lawn of a wealthy resident of Mount Vernon, and the rest were on other estates, purchased from wreckers or taken from those with influence over the railroads.

The two eagles that sit atop the terminal were donated to the MTA around the turn of the 21st century. One had stood for years in a backyard in Bronxville, New York; in 1999, it was placed atop the Lexington Avenue entrance to Grand Central Market. The other was at a monastery in Garrison, New York (the present-day Garrison Institute), and was installed in 2004 at the terminal's southwest entrance by Vanderbilt Avenue and 42nd Street.

Eight identical eagle statues are elsewhere, including one at a private home in Kings Point, New York; one at the Space Farms Zoo and Museum in Beemerville, New Jersey; two at the Vanderbilt Museum in Long Island; one, known as the "Shandaken Eagle", in Phoenicia, New York; two at Saint Basil Academy in Garrison; and one at the Philipse Manor station in Sleepy Hollow. One or two of Grand Central Station's eagles remain lost.

New York City's former Penn Station was adorned with 22 eagle sculptures, many of which were similarly dispersed across the United States after the building's demolition.

=== Interior ===
==== Ceiling ====
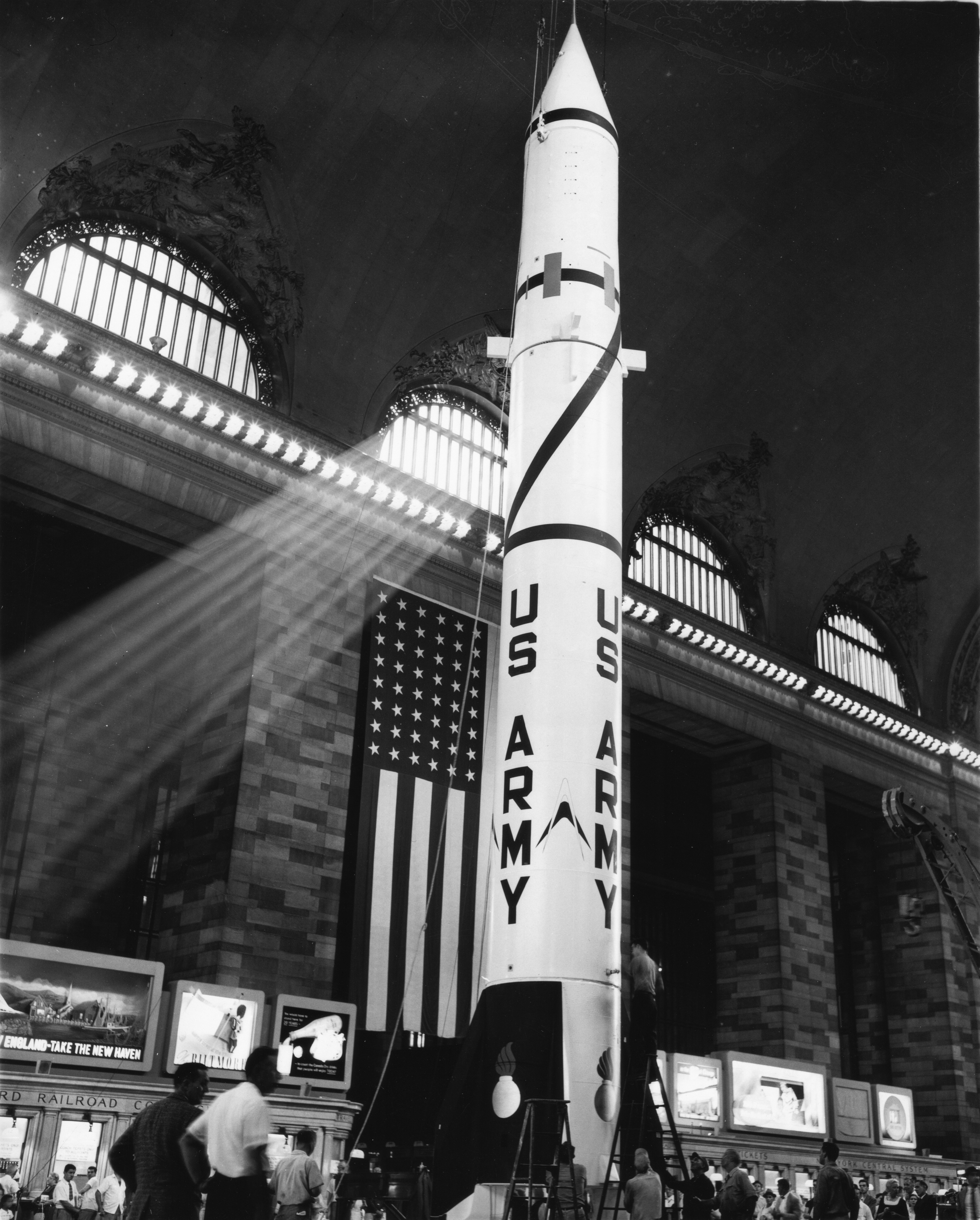
The Redstone missile, 1957

The Main Concourse's ceiling is an elliptical barrel vault. A false ceiling of square boards, installed in 1944, bears an elaborate celestial mural painted with more than 2,500 stars and several bands in gold set against a turquoise backdrop. This ceiling covers the original 1913 version, which had degraded because of water damage.

Original plans called for the ceiling to contain a skylight, but money and time ran out. Instead, a mural was painted directly on the ceiling. It was conceived in 1912 by architect Warren and painter Paul César Helleu. The latter, who had come to the United States for a three-month stay to create portraits of eight women for a Parisian magazine, sketched a conceptual design for Warren. Helleu worked from a chart given by Columbia University astronomy professor Harold Jacoby, who had derived it from the Uranometria, a scientifically accurate star atlas published in 1603. The mural was painted in 1913 by James Monroe Hewlett and Charles Basing of Hewlett-Basing Studio. They were assisted in the design by Helleu and multiple astronomers, and in the painting by more than 50 painting assistants. Around 63 electric bulbs were installed to amplify the visual impact of the stars. The depicted constellations include those of the winter zodiac viewable from January to June, from Aquarius to Cancer. Also depicted are Pegasus, Triangulum Majus and Minus, Musca Borealis, and Orion, as well as two broad gold bands spanning the ceiling, representing the ecliptic and the equator. Triangulum Minus (not present on the original mural, but added in 1944) and Musca Borealis are the only constellations not taken from the Uranometria.

By the 1920s, the roof began to leak, damaging the mural with water and mold. Over the next two decades, the mural "faded to a hue something like that of a khaki shirt overdosed with Navy blue". In August 1944, New York Central covered the original ceiling with 4-by-8-foot cement-and-asbestos boards and painted them in a facsimile of the original mural. Unveiled in June 1945, the new mural contained less astronomical detail; it also lacked light bulbs to mimic stars. The boards' outlines remain visible today.

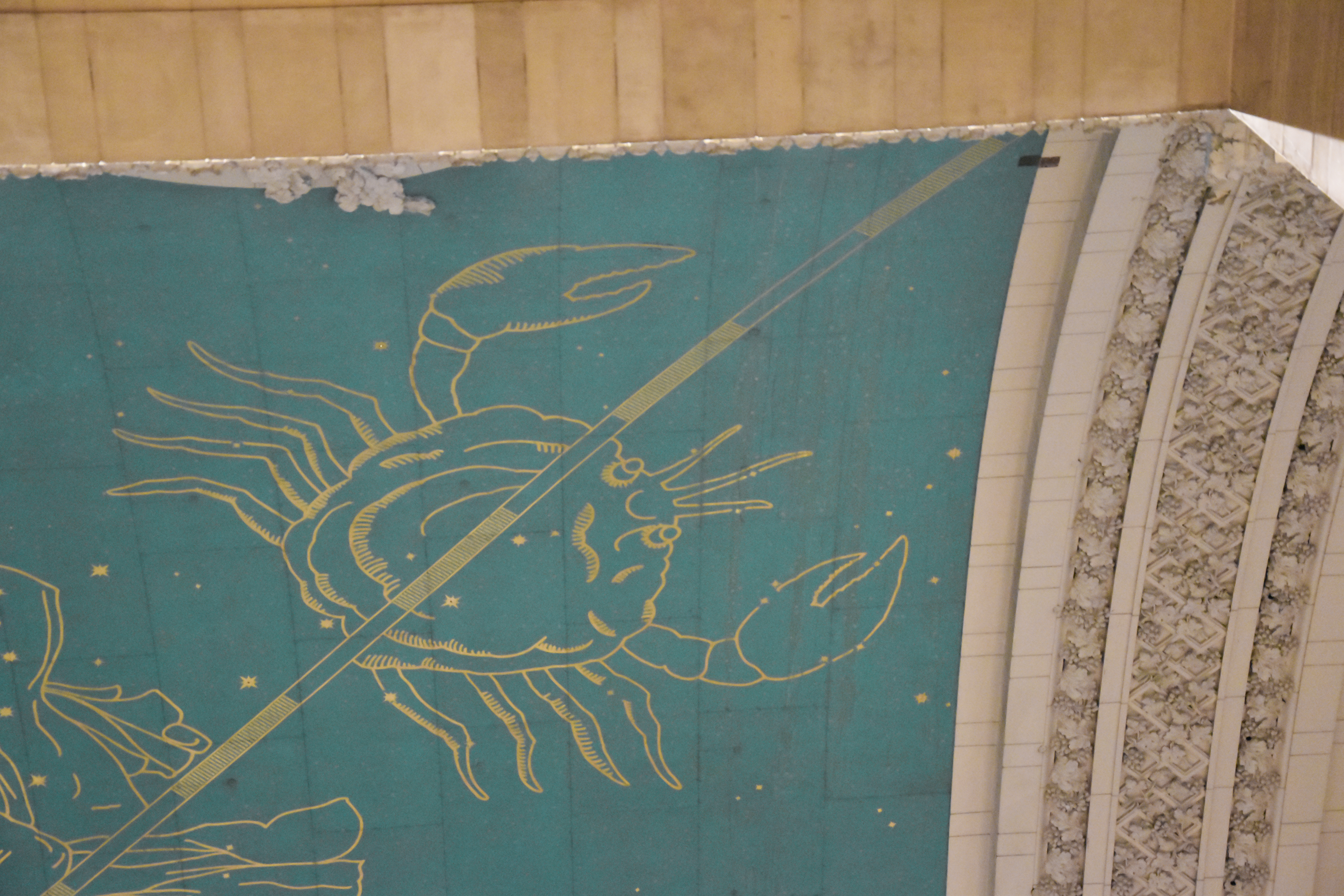
Constellation of Cancer pointing toward the uncleaned ceiling patch

By the 1980s, the new ceiling was obscured by decades of grime. The dirt buildup was sometimes reported to be tar and nicotine from tobacco smoke, or diesel or coal soot from the trains in the terminal's train shed (though trains have utilized electric power in Manhattan since 1908). Spectroscopic examination revealed that it was made up of air pollutants from trucks and cars as well as soot and contaminants from incinerators and factories. As a general renovation of the terminal got underway, historians and preservationists called for the 1944 boards to be removed and the original ceiling mural restored. But Beyer Blinder Belle, the architecture firm that led the renovation, deemed the original mural irreversibly damaged and noted that the asbestos-laden boards would be hazardous to remove. So, starting in September 1996, the ceiling boards were cleaned and repainted. Lights were installed into the ceiling boards to imitate the stars, restoring a feature previously only seen from 1913 to 1944. A single dark patch near the constellation Cancer(representing a crab) was left untouched by renovators to remind visitors of the grime that once covered the ceiling.

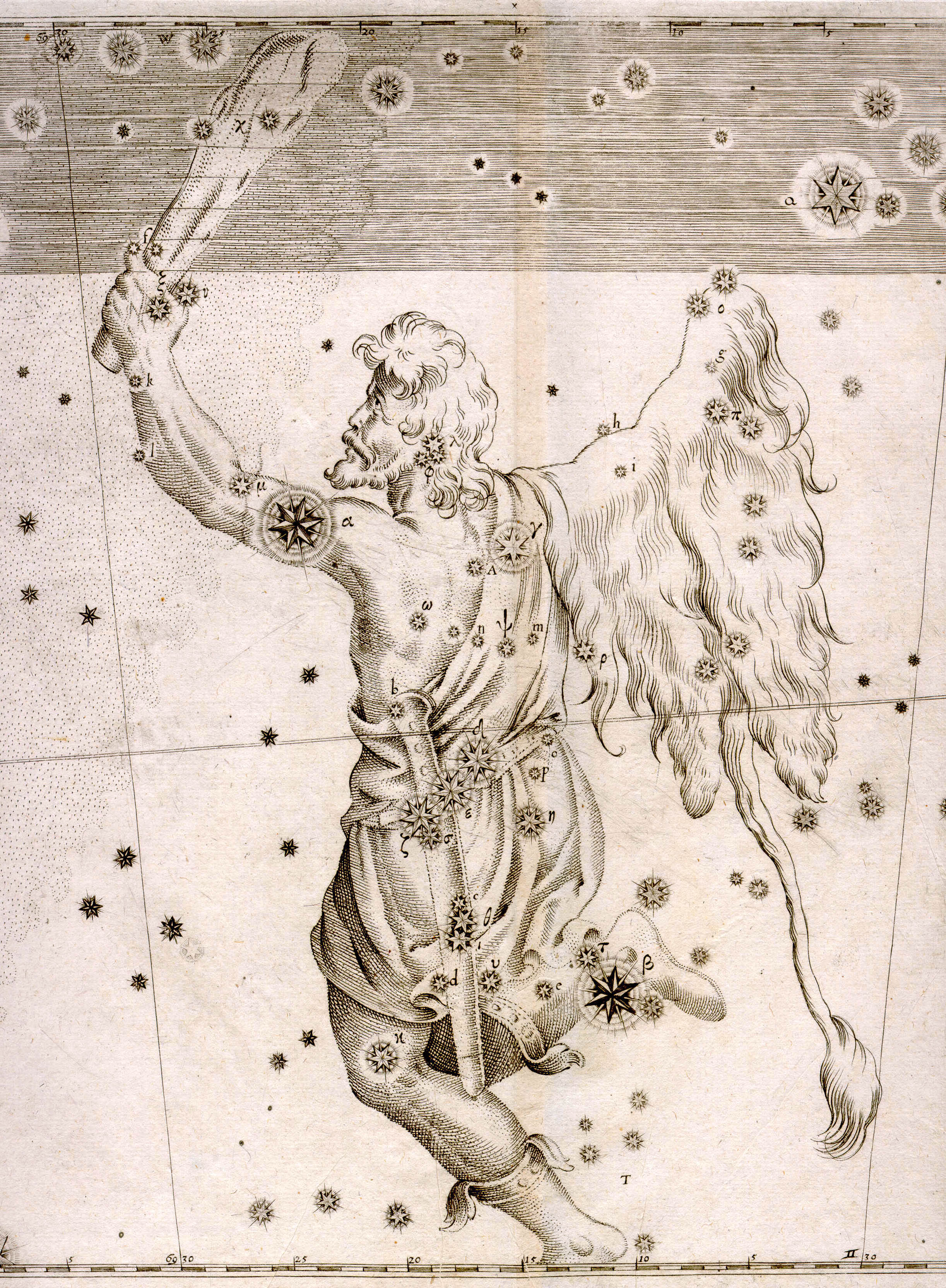
Orion, the only constellation Helleu displayed correctly

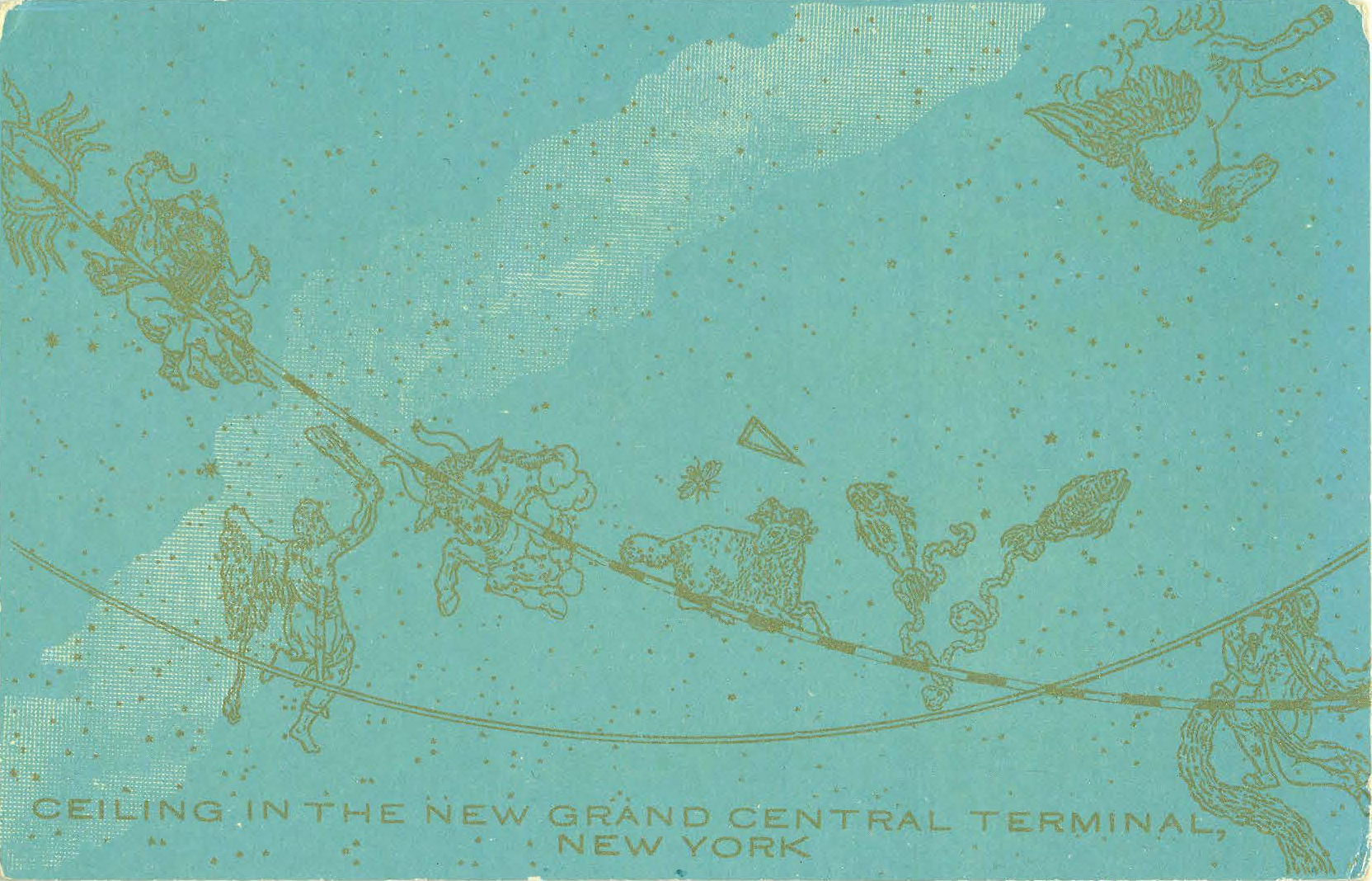
C. 1913 postcard of Helleu's design – 11 of 12 elements displayed correctly

The ceiling bears a small dark circle amid the stars above the image of Pisces. In a 1957 attempt to improve public morale after the Soviet Union launched Sputnik, an American Redstone missile was set up in the Main Concourse. With no other way to erect the missile, a hole was cut into the 1944 false ceiling to allow a cable to be lowered to lift the rocket into place. Historical preservation dictated that this hole remain as a reminder of the many uses of the Terminal over the years.

The starry ceiling contains several astronomical inaccuracies. The entire artwork is reversed left-to-right from the Uranometria and the night sky, except for Orion. There are various explanations that are often given for this error. One possible explanation is that the overall ceiling design might have been based on the medieval custom of depicting the sky as it would appear to God looking in at the celestial sphere from outside, but that would have reversed Orion as well. A more likely explanation is partially mistaken transcription of the sketch supplied by Harold Jacoby, the explanation Jacoby gave when the issue was brought to him. Jacoby surmised that Basing had placed the sketch at his feet, rather than holding it up toward the ceiling, when copying its details. Though the astronomical inconsistencies were noticed promptly by a commuter within a month of the station's opening, they have not been corrected in any of the subsequent renovations of the ceiling. Postcards printed before the terminal's opening show the ceiling artwork correctly.

==== Graybar Passage mural ====
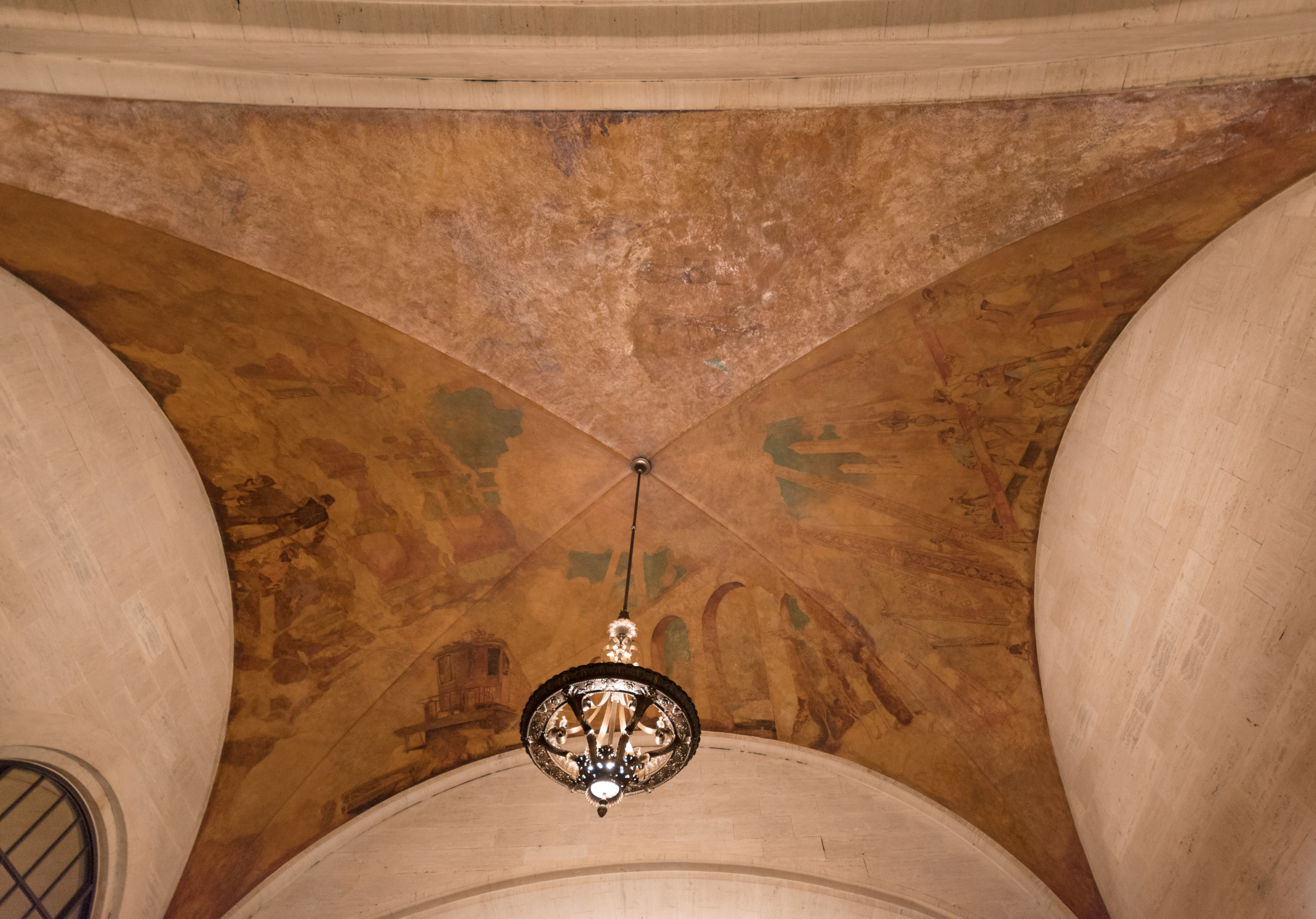
Trumbull's mural

The Graybar Passage extends from the northeast corner of the Main Concourse, underneath the Graybar Building, directly east to Lexington Avenue. The ceiling is composed of seven groin vaults, each of which has an ornamental bronze chandelier. One of the vaults features a mural depicting American transportation. The work was painted in 1927 by muralist Edward Trumbull. The first two vaults viewed from leaving Grand Central featured cumulus clouds, while the third remains, featuring technologies that had significantly affected the world. These include a train pulled by an electric locomotive, a bridge resembling the original design of the city's High Bridge, the construction of a skyscraper, the manufacturing of steel, and several airplanes (including the Spirit of St. Louis) along with a searchlight and radio tower. The mural has a caramel color; the once-bright colors present have faded over time. Originally, every vault in the passage ceiling was to be painted similarly to the existing work, though project funding fell short during the Great Depression.

==== Sirshasana ====
Sirshasana, an aluminum and polyester resin sculpture with crystals, was created by Donald Lipski in 1998. The sculpture hangs from the ceiling of Grand Central Market just inside its 43rd Street entrance. The chandelier has the shape of an olive tree, with branches spanning 25 feet and featuring 5,000 crystal pendants. The base of the tree is finished in gold and crystals, in place of olives. The sculpture is named after a headstand posture in yoga: the inverted tree. The work alludes to Grand Central's decorative chandeliers, and is a "comment on the allure of the exotic and tempting wares sold in the marketplace".

==== As Above, So Below ====
As Above, So Below, a work of glass, bronze, and mosaic in several Grand Central North passageways, was made by Brooklyn-based artist Ellen Driscoll in 1998. The mosaic's five scenes, each stemming from a different continent, depict myths and legends about the heavens that reflect life on Earth. The work reminds passengers of humanity's spiritual and worldly past. Like the terminal's astronomical ceiling, it symbolizes the connection to the wider world and heavens.

Details of &quot;As Above, So Below&quot;

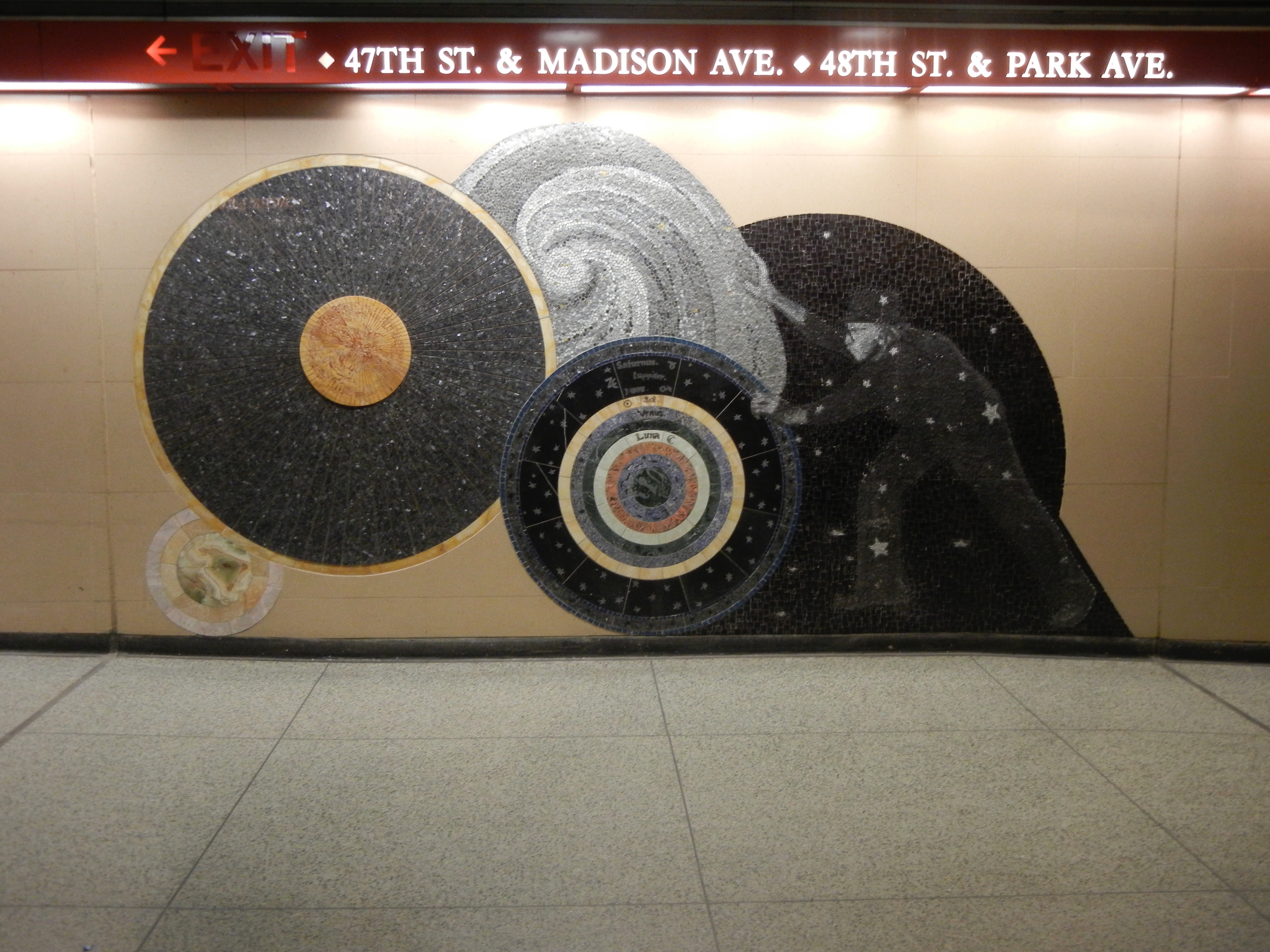
As Above, So Below Sisyphus mosaic

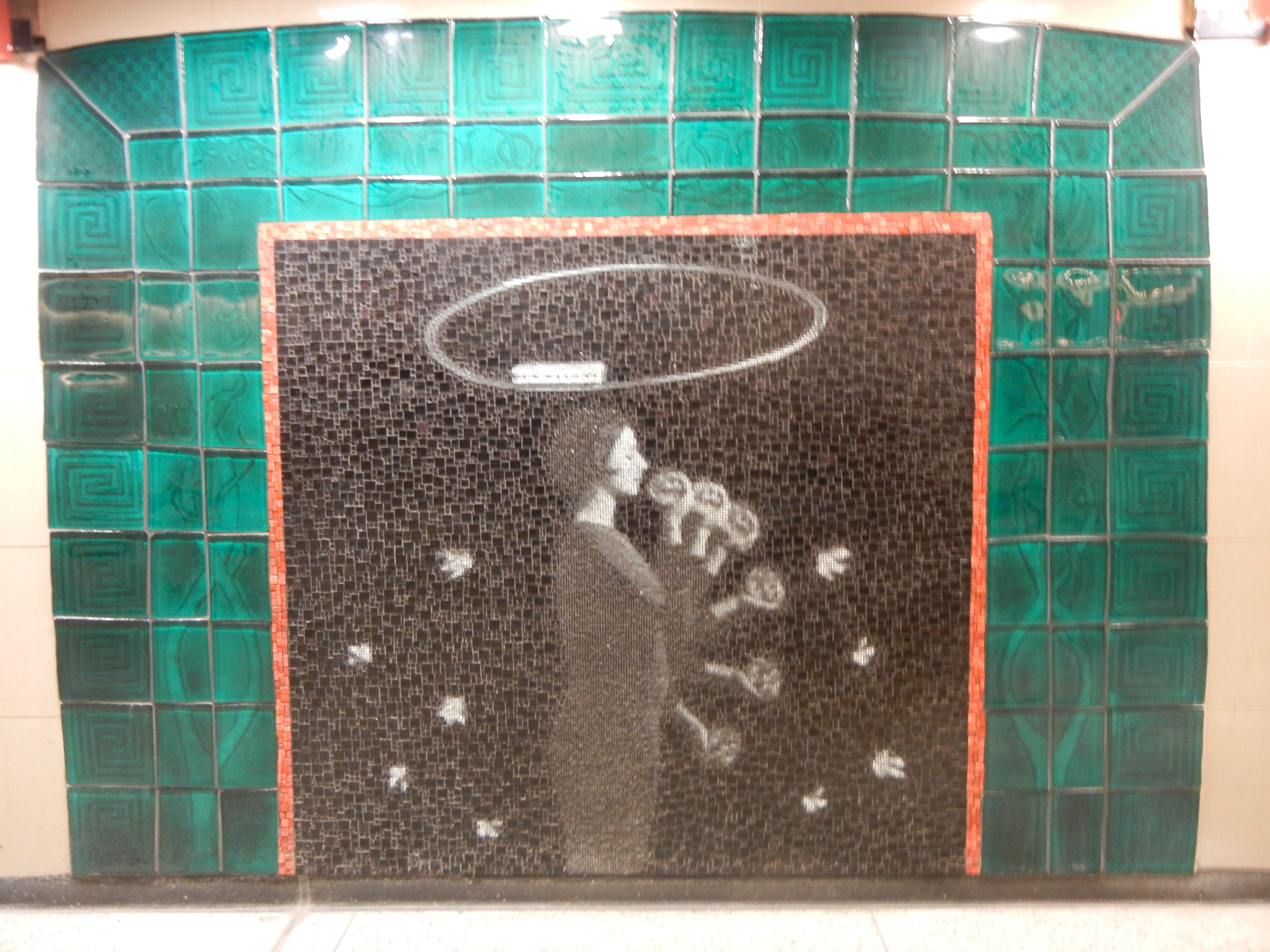
As Above, So Below Persephone mosaic

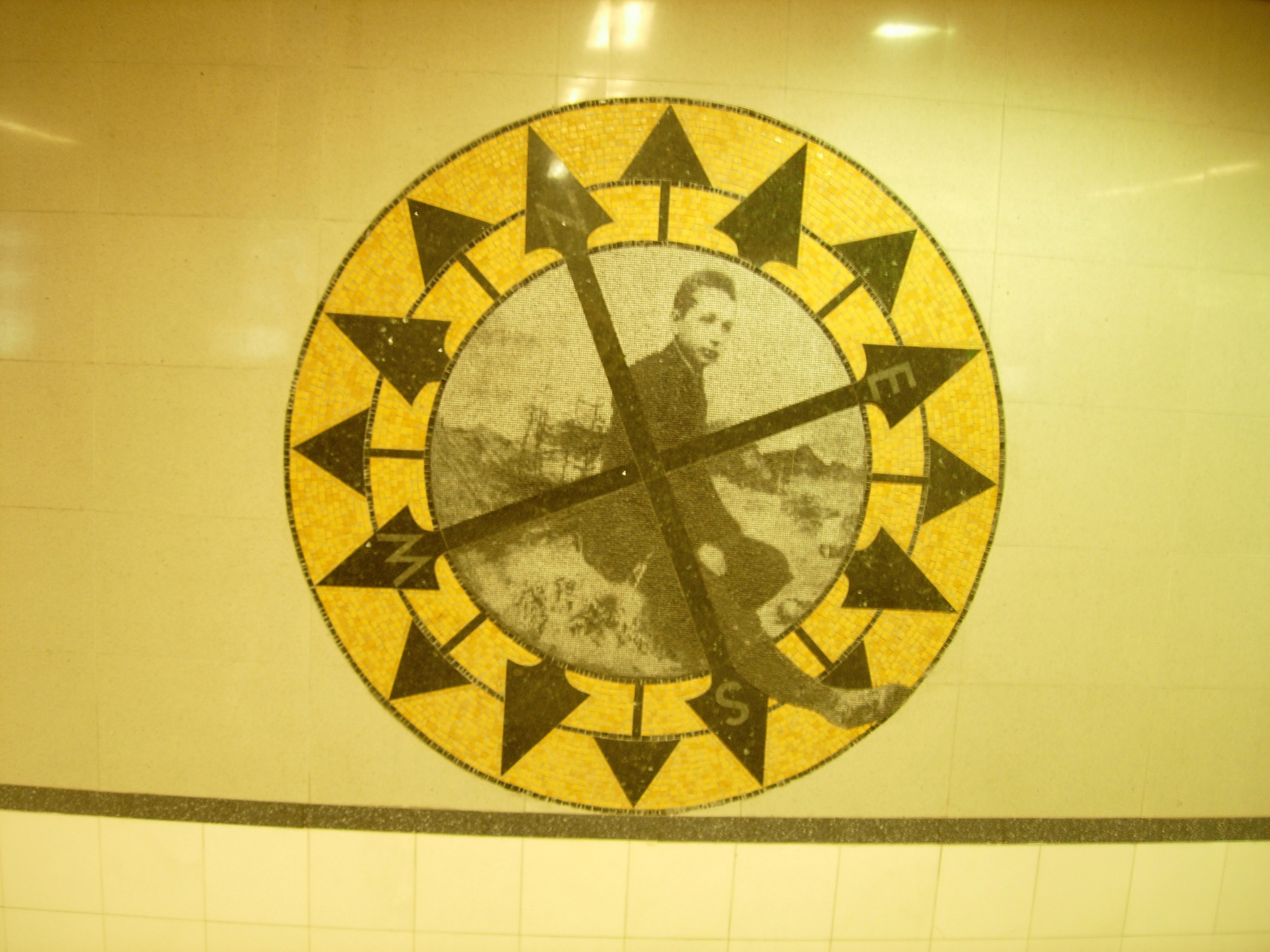
As Above, So Below Einstein mosaic

==== A Field of Wild Flowers ====
A Field of Wild Flowers, a mural on the walls of the Station Master's Office, was made by Roberto Juarez in 1997. The work uses many materials to give texture, strength, and beauty. Layers include gesso, under-painting, urethane, and varnish, along with rice paper and a dusting of peat moss. It depicts a bountiful garden landscape as viewed though windows of a slow-moving train. It repeats some of Grand Central's architectural details, including fruit, acorns, and garlands.

==== Other ====
Central Cellars, formerly the Grand Central Theatre

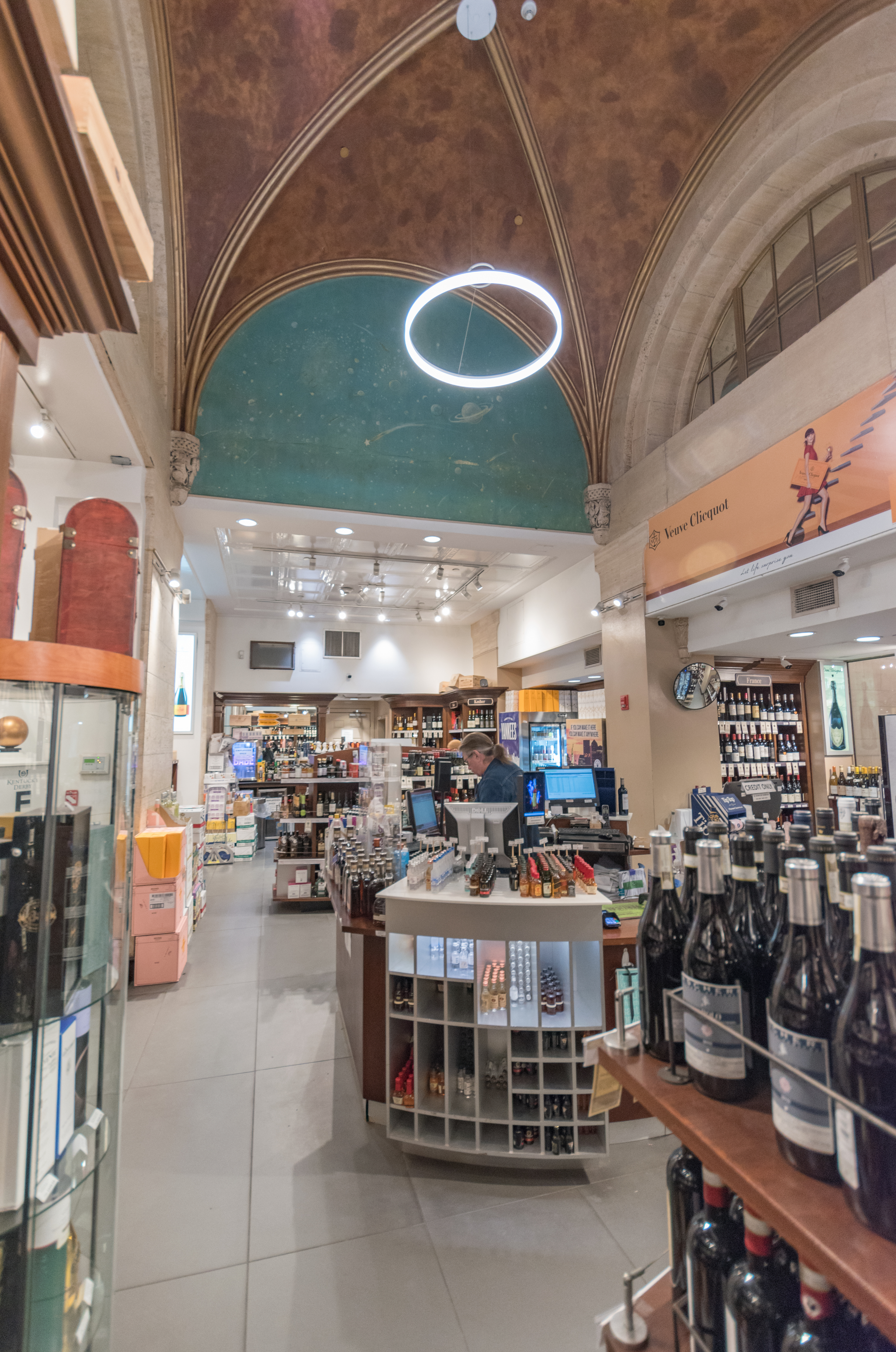
Interior showing projection window

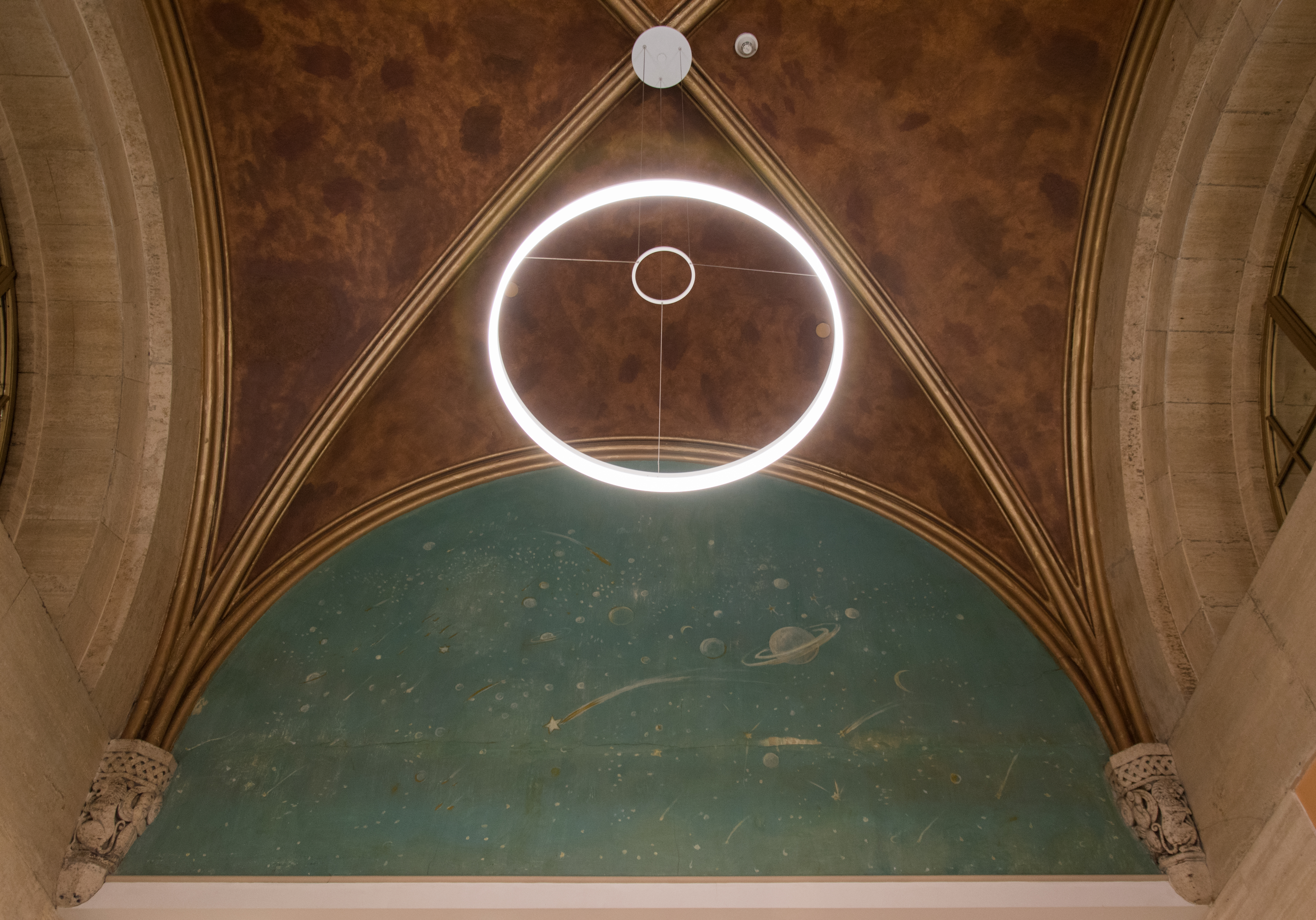
Mural echoing the Main Concourse ceiling

In the Grand Central Theatre or Terminal Newsreel Theatre, now one of the retail areas of the Graybar Passage and currently the alcohol vendor Central Cellars, the movie theater lobby had walls covered with large world maps and an astronomical mural painted by Tony Sarg. The theater opened in 1937 and operated for about 30 years before being gutted for retail space. A renovation in the early 2000s removed a false ceiling, revealing the theater's astronomical mural (similar in colors and style to the Main Concourse ceiling) and projection window.

The Dining Concourse has 16 lightboxes that form a quadriptych. MTA Arts & Design maintains a rotating art exhibition in the space. The first non-photographic exhibit in the space was On Paper/ Grand Central at 100, which was created for the terminal's centennial and was displayed from September 2013 to September 2014. It featured four works by contemporary and international paper cut artists: Thomas Witte's Cutting Shadows, Xin Song's Time · Light · Gate · Clock, Laura Cooperman's Overhead, and Rob Ryans' There Is Only Time. The works use themes from Grand Central's architecture and grandeur, and family memories.

On Paper/ Grand Central at 100

As of 2019, the space features "Landmark City", a photographic exhibit by Marc Yankus. The exhibit shows New York City landmarks, altered to appear on empty streets.

== Exhibitions and performances ==
=== Special exhibitions ===
Grand Central Terminal has held a number of special exhibits, including:

- In June 1948, a fashion show by Filene's and the New Haven Railroad was hosted on the balcony of the Main Concourse, and a thousand square feet of sand was imported for the event. The show also used space at Track 61, in a storage yard north of Grand Central.
- In 1993, a portion of Ruckus Manhattan, an exhibit by Red Grooms, was displayed in the Vanderbilt Hall.
- In 1995, Lost: New York Projects by Christian Boltanski involved a display, titled Lost Property, of about 5,000 personal belongings from the terminal's lost-and-found, on display on metal shelves in the Biltmore Room.
- In 1997, Chrysanne Stathacos created the Wish Machine, an interactive installation where passers-by could buy a scent from a vending-machine-style installation which would in turn aid them in manifesting a desire. The work was commissioned by Creative Time as part of their Day With(out) Art initiative.
- In 2004, Rudolf Stingel debuted his first work of public art at Grand Central, in Vanderbilt Hall, titled "Plan B".
- In 2009, the hall hosted four of the BMW Art Cars, cars which were painted by Andy Warhol, Frank Stella, Roy Lichtenstein, and Robert Rauschenberg.
- In October 2025, Grand Central hosted Dear New York, a two-week installation by Brandon Stanton of Humans of New York that displayed portraits and stories from the project across the terminal's advertising screens and as projections on the Main Concourse pillars. The installation was designed in collaboration with Pentagram and creative director David Korins, and featured daily programming with emerging New York artists and Juilliard students.

=== Events ===
The Main Concourse and Vanderbilt Hall frequently host special exhibits and events. These include:

- Every year, the terminal has had concerts with Christmas carols and organ recitals. In the 1930s, a woman named Mary Lee Read would often give organ concerts from one of the terminal's balconies.
- In 1935, the Works Progress Administration-backed Manhattan Concert Band performed
- In 1943, an Easter performance was given by the Princeton Theological Seminary choir.
- In 1987, the performing arts organization Dancing in the Streets presented Grand Central Dances. The production involved the dance companies of Merce Cunningham, Lucinda Childs, Paul Thompson and Stephan Koplowitz, as well as the high-wire artist Philippe Petit and juggler Michael Moschen. The event included "Terminal Triptych", an hour-long dance in the Biltmore Room, "Fenestrations", a 13-minute dance on four levels of the Main Concourse's window catwalks, and a tight-rope walk across the concourse by Petit.
- In 1988, a Double Dutch jump-roping competition was held in the Main Concourse as part of a city-sponsored "Summer Games".
- In 2011, a flash mob show by Moncler Grenoble took place in the Main Concourse.
- In 2013, Nick Cave and dancers from the Alvin Ailey American Dance Theater organized the performance Heard NY. The performance took place in Vanderbilt Hall, the Main Concourse, and on the catwalks between the terminal's arched windows. The MTA had approached Cave for this project for the terminal's centennial, and the performance piece ran for one week.

=== Musical performances ===
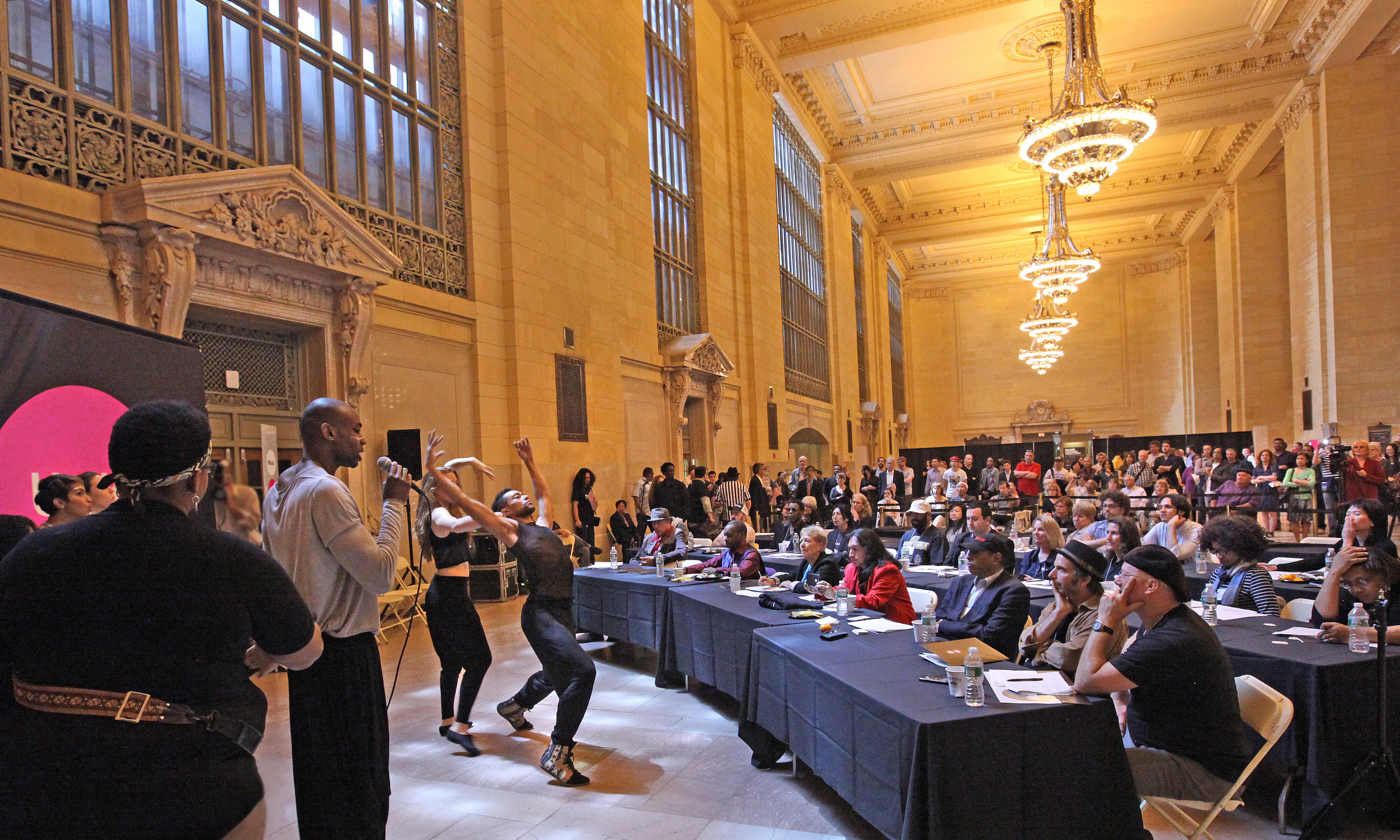
Music Under New York audition, 2014

The terminal hosts numerous performances. It is also a host site for Music Under New York, where musicians can perform within various transit hubs controlled by the MTA. In Grand Central, artists can perform in the Graybar Passage as well as in the Dining Concourse, opposite Tracks 105 and 106. Auditions for the program take place each spring in the terminal's Vanderbilt Hall.

Beginning during the Christmas season of 1928 and continuing on certain holidays until 1958, an organist performed in Grand Central's North Gallery. The organist was Mary Lee Read, who initially performed on a borrowed Hammond organ. Grand Central management eventually bought an organ and a set of chimes for the station and began paying Read an annual retainer. In addition to the weeks before Christmas, Read played during the weeks before Thanksgiving and Easter and on Mother's Day. On one Easter, a choir composed of Works Progress Administration employees performed with her. Following the attack on Pearl Harbor, she attempted to lift spirits by playing "The Star-Spangled Banner", which brought the main concourse to a standstill. The stationmaster subsequently asked her to avoid selections that would cause passengers to miss their trains, and Read became known as the only organist in New York who was forbidden to play the United States' national anthem.

In 2018, Paul McCartney gave a private concert in the terminal on the premiere date of his new album Egypt Station, with guests including Jon Bon Jovi, Meryl Streep, Amy Schumer, Kate Moss and Steve Buscemi. In February 2020, South Korean pop group BTS staged a live performance of their song, "ON", at the Main Concourse.

== Art featuring Grand Central ==
Sun-lit Main Concourse photographs

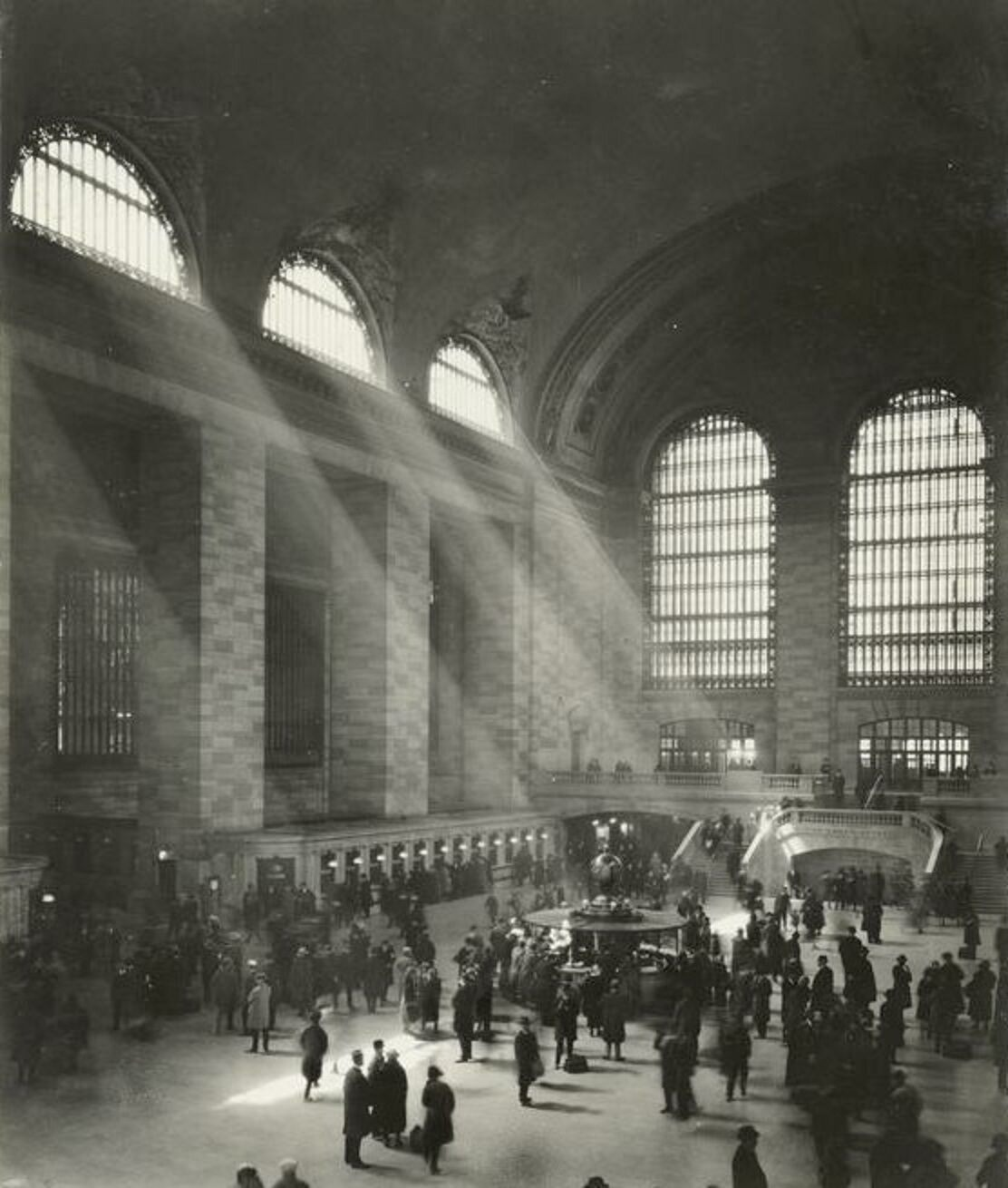
View toward the west stairs, c. 1923

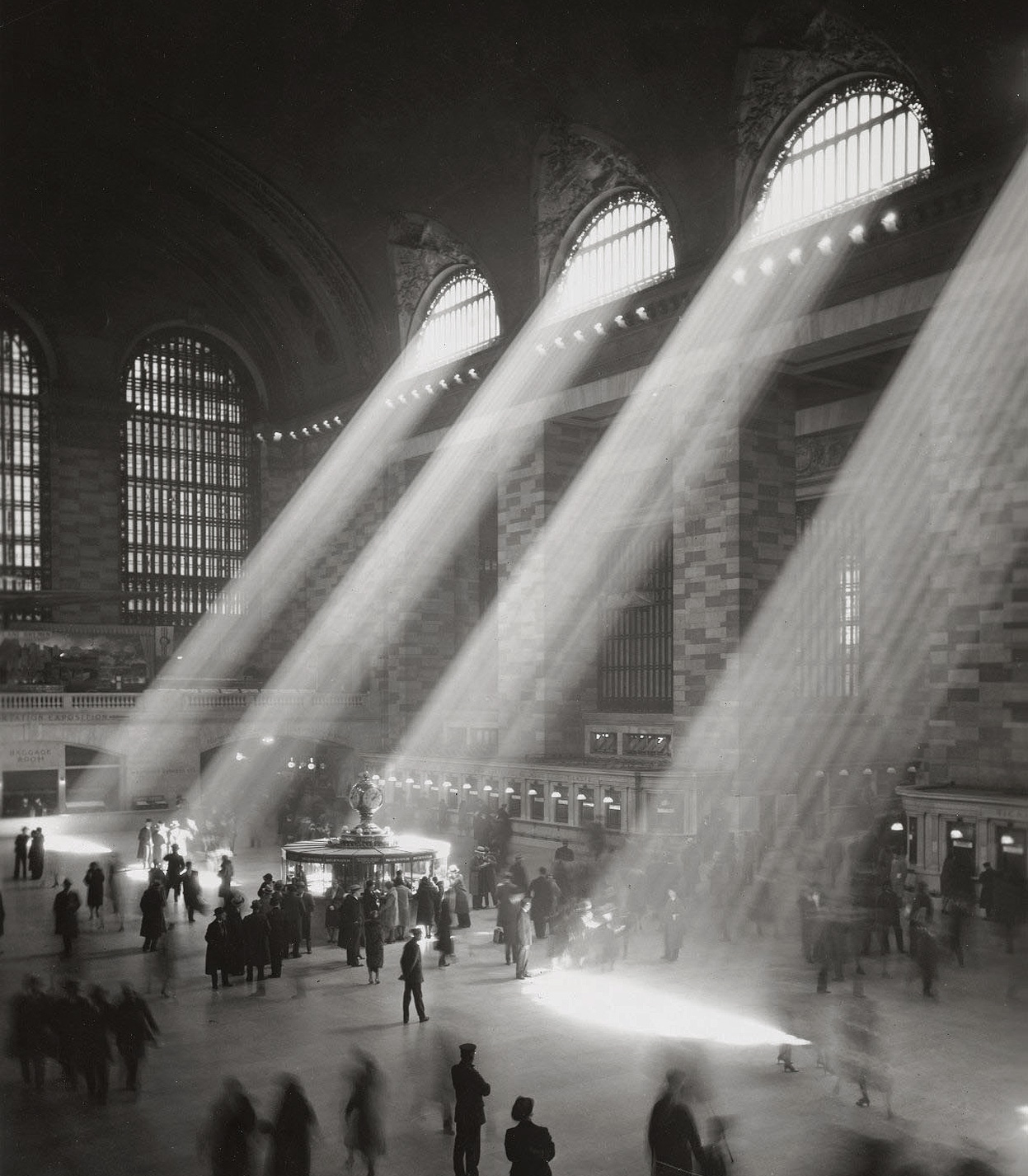
View toward the east balcony, c. 1930

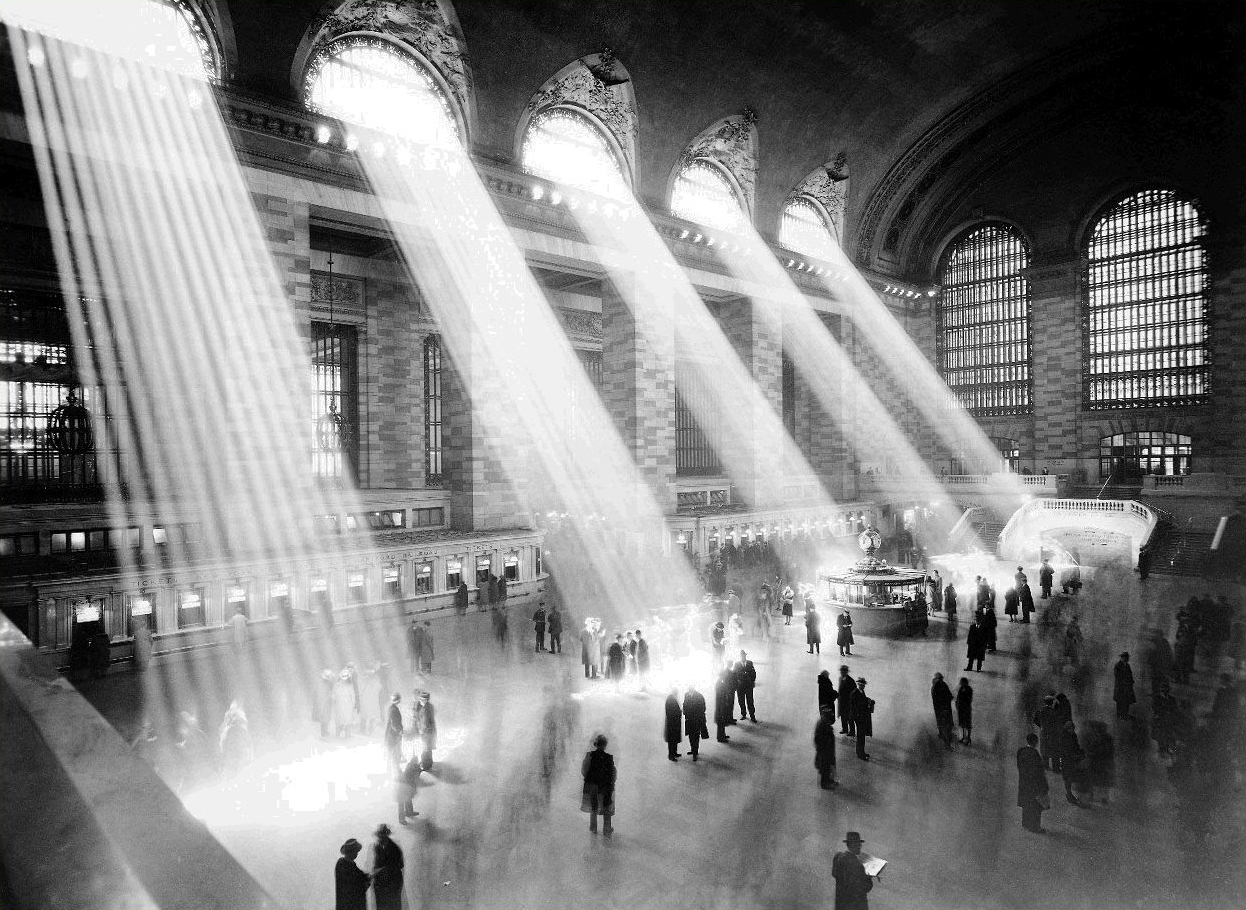
View toward the west stairs, c. 1935 to 1941

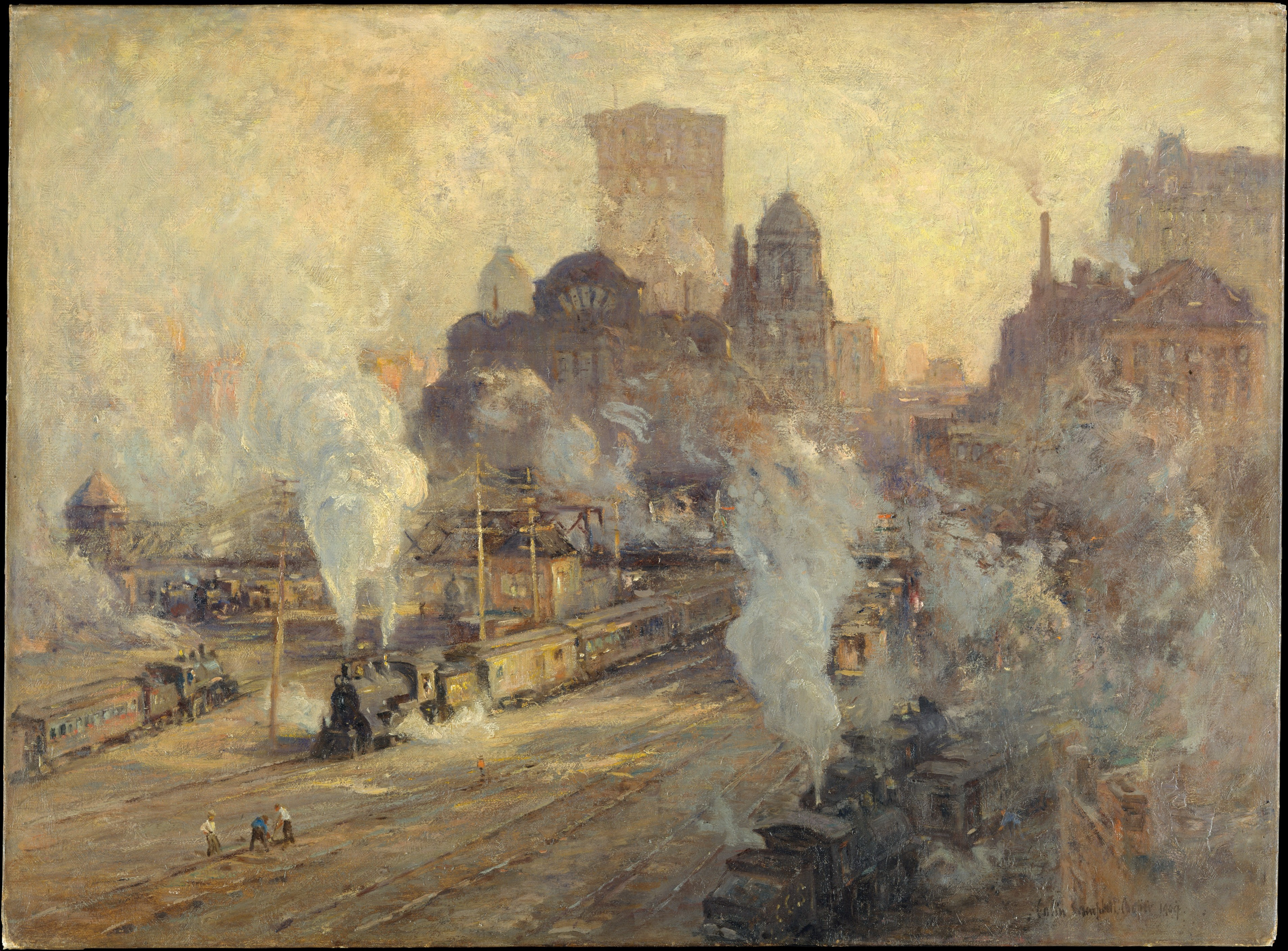
Colin Campbell Cooper, Grand Central Station, 1909

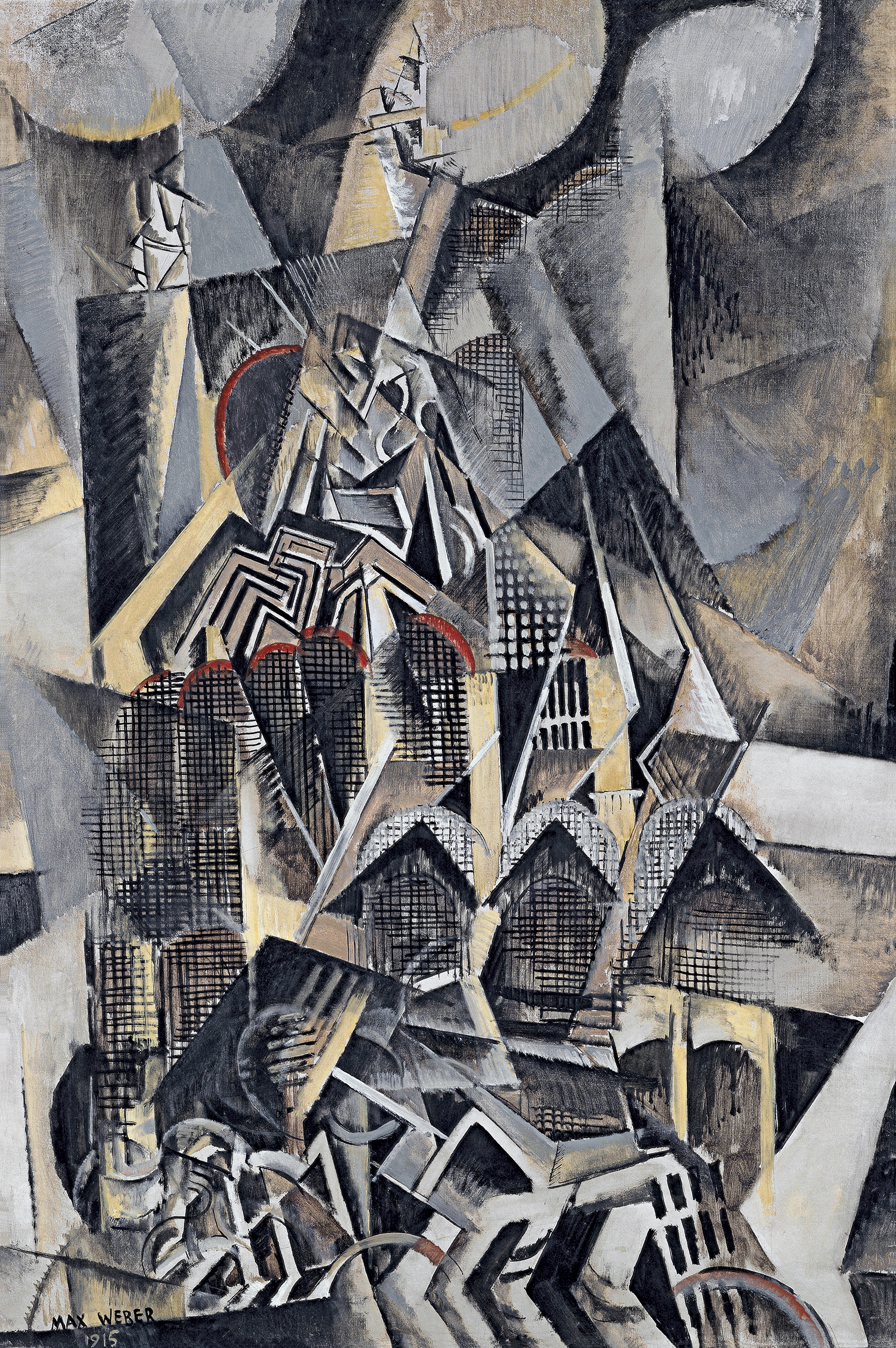
Max Weber, Grand Central Terminal, 1915

Grand Central is one of the most-photographed places in New York City and the United States. A 2009 Cornell University study mapping out geotagged photos worldwide indicated the building was the fourth most photographed in New York City.

One of the most famous photographs of the terminal shows light streaming from Main Concourse windows down to the floor. The work is reproduced online through hundreds of different images, with variations in angles, cropping, flipping, filters, and watermarks, as well as the author and date attributed to the works. Photographer Penelope Umbrico collected a sample of such images in Four Photographs of Rays of Sunlight in Grand Central, on display in the terminal's Dining Concourse.

Paintings depicting Grand Central include:

- John French Sloan, Grand Central Station, 1924
- Max Weber, Grand Central Terminal, 1915
- Jim Campbell, Grand Central Station #2, 2009
- Ernest Lawson, Old Grand Central
- Howard Thain, Grand Central Station, N.Y.C., 1927
- Howard Thain, Park Avenue at 42nd Street, N.Y.C., 1927
- Johann Berthelsen, Grand Central Station in Snow
- Colin Campbell Cooper, Grand Central Station, 1909

== See also ==
- MTA Arts & Design
- Grand Central Madison art

== Works cited ==
1. Belle, John; Leighton, Maxinne Rhea (2000). Grand Central: Gateway to a Million Lives. Norton. p. 37. ISBN 978-0-393-04765-3.
2. Bilotto, Gregory; DiLorenzo, Frank (2017). Building Grand Central Terminal. Arcadia Publishing Incorporated. ISBN 978-1-4396-6051-5. Archived from the original on February 17, 2023.
3. Langmead, Donald (2009). Icons of American Architecture: From the Alamo to the World Trade Center. Greenwood Icons. Greenwood Press. ISBN 978-0-313-34207-3. Archived from the original on February 17, 2023.
4. Roberts, Sam (January 22, 2013). Grand Central: How a Train Station Transformed America. Grand Central Publishing. ISBN 978-1-4555-2595-9.
5. Robins, A.W.; New York Transit Museum (2013). Grand Central Terminal: 100 Years of a New York Landmark. ABRAMS. ISBN 978-1-61312-387-4. Archived from the original on February 17, 2023.
6. Schlichting, Kurt C. (2001). Grand Central Terminal: Railroads, Architecture and Engineering in New York. Baltimore: Johns Hopkins University Press. ISBN 0-8018-6510-7.
