= Charles Basing =

American painter

- Born: July 23, 1864; Linton near Ballarat, Victoria (Australia)
- Died: March 3, 1933 (aged 68); Marrakesh, Morocco
- Resting place: Christian Cemetery in Marrakesh

Charles Basing (1864-1933) was an American artist active in New York City and Provincetown, Massachusetts, in the early 20th century. In 1900–1903 he studied at the Academie Julien in Paris with William-Adolph Bouguereau, and in 1911 he became a member of the Salmagundi Club. Many of Basing's easel paintings depict the environs of New York City, and he also painted murals including the ceiling mural depicting the zodiac at Grand Central Terminal. Basing died of blood poisoning in Marrakesh Morocco on February 3, 1933, after a camel stepped on his foot.

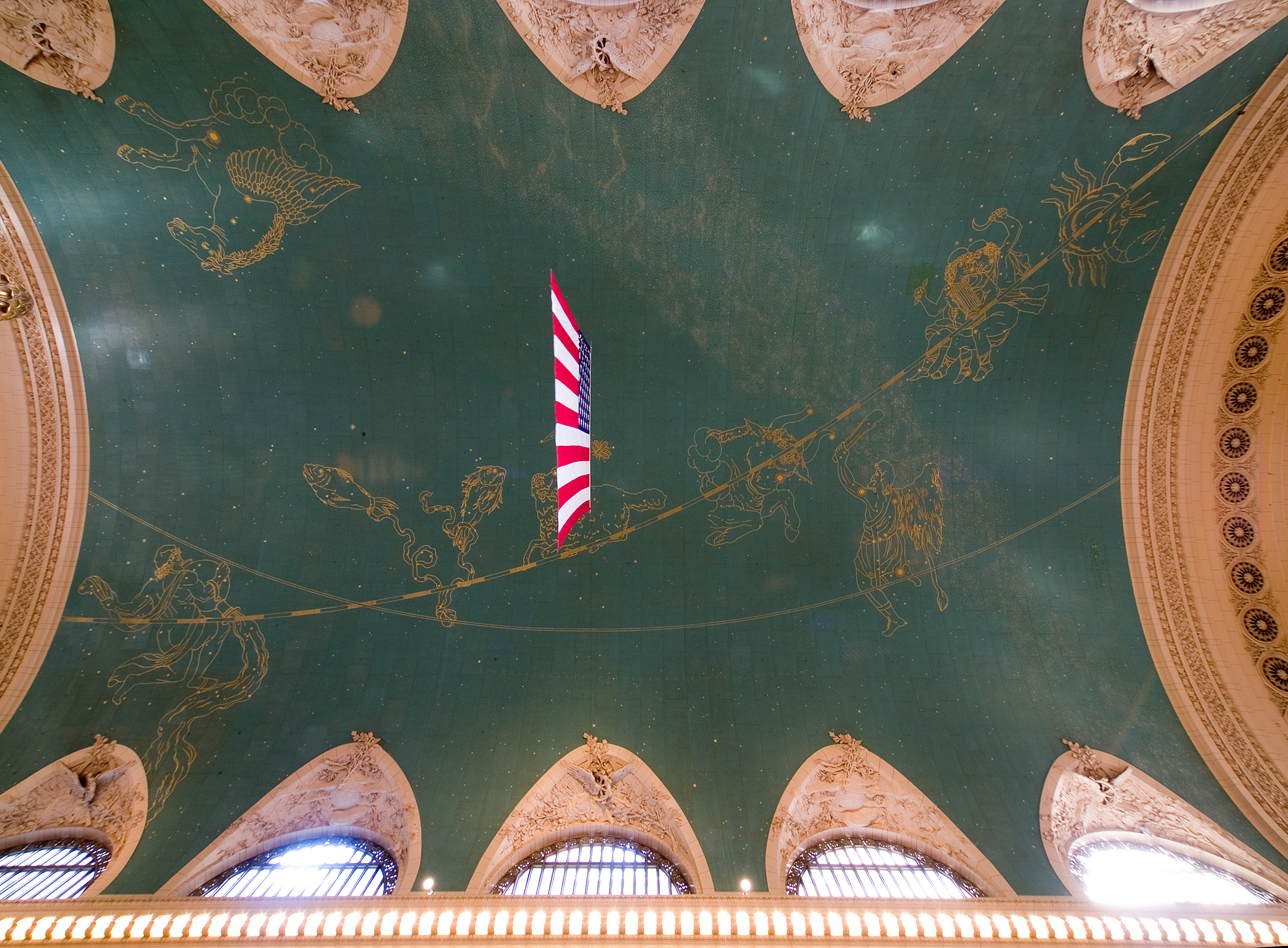
NYC Grand Central Terminal ceiling
