= Sondern (land division) =

A Sondern or Sundern was a type of land segregation in the Middle Ages in Germany, especially in North Rhine-Westphalia. It gave personal entitlement to farm specific areas of land without owning the land. A Königssondern (royal sondern) is land whose use was administered by the King. The term is still found in many place names, indicating the history of the locality.
