= Sondern, Radevormwald =

Village in Germany

Coordinates: 51°13′50″N 7°20′16″E

Sondern is a small village approximately 6 kilometres (3.7 mi) the north of Radevormwald, in Oberbergischer Kreis district, North Rhine-Westphalia, Germany. It lies to the south of Remlingrade, and close to Birken, Im Kamp, and Herkingrade. Politically, the village falls under the electoral district 170 of the Radevormwald City Council. Around the year 1400, it was recorded as “Sunderen” in documents from the archives of the Reformed Church in Radevormwald, in relation to the delineation of the boundaries of the Free Court of Radevormwald at the time.
