= Sondern, Olpe =

Coordinates: 51°4′24″N 7°50′29″E

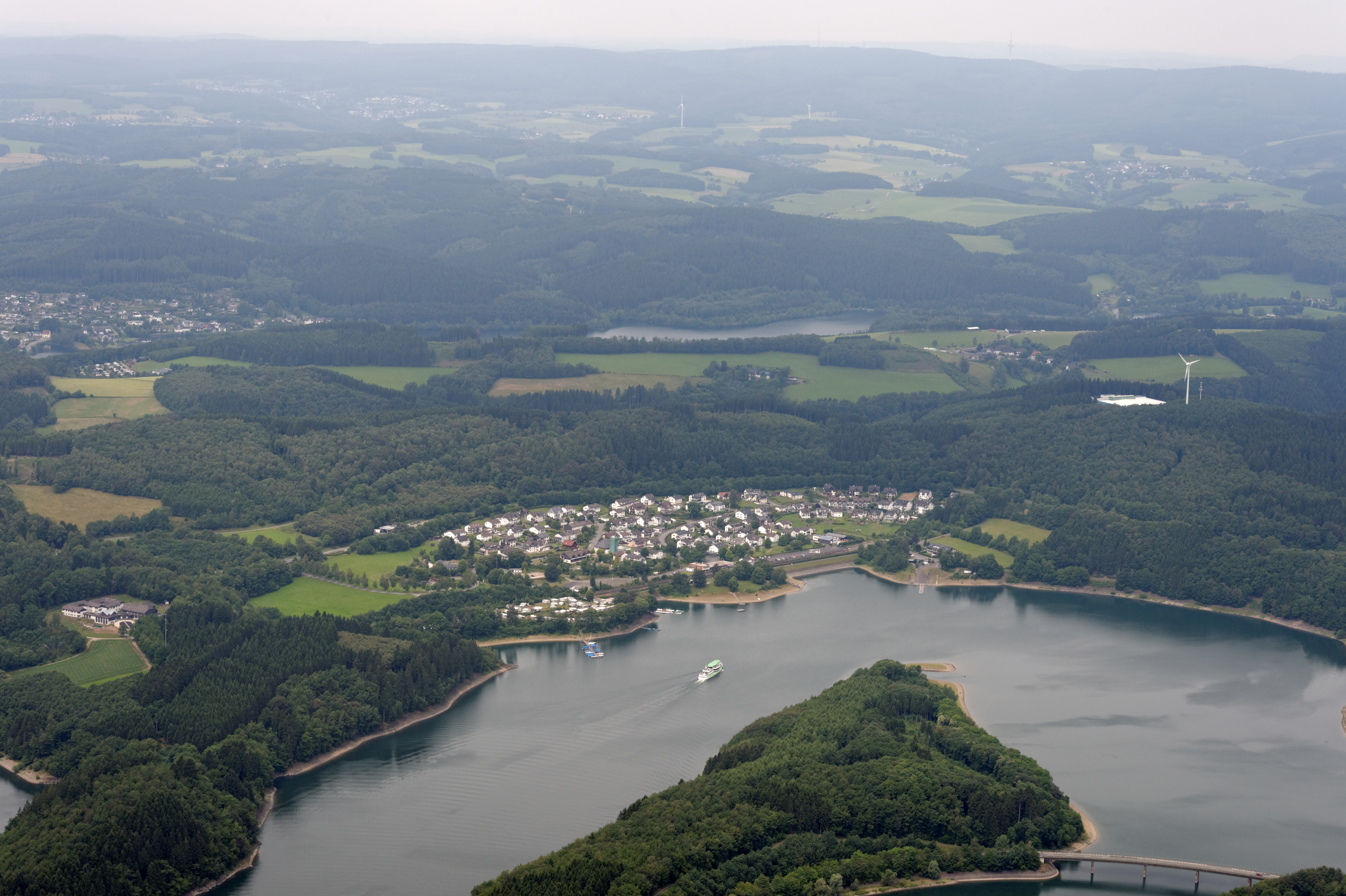

Sondern is a village in Olpe district, in North Rhine-Westphalia, Germany. As of 2011 it had a population of 484 people. It contains a leisure complex and campsite on the shores of a lake.
