= Sondern, Halver =

Coordinates: 51°9′57″N 7°29′6″E

Sondern is a village and subdistrict of Halver, in Märkischer Kreis district, North Rhine-Westphalia, Germany. First mentioned in 1480, it is situated north of the state road L284, not far from the settlements of Kückelhausen, Auf der Brake, Schlade and Ehberg.
