= Sondern, Wuppertal =

Human settlement in Germany

Coordinates: 51°14′44″N 7°16′40″E

Sondern is a village and subdistrict approximately 15.4 kilometres (9.6 mi) by road south-south east of Wuppertal, North Rhine-Westphalia, Germany. Situated near Beyenburger, it is situated in a valley between the rivers of Herbringhauser Bachs, the Wupper and the Lohmühlenbachs. The national road 411 descends to Beyenburger bridge. The Dynamit Nobel AG explosives factory was in the vicinity, which passed after the First World War to the Pyros Fireworks Company. In the 1920s, the factory was destroyed by fire and never rebuilt. In the northwestern part of the village is the Turn-Sport-Verein Beyenburg 1945 e.V sports club.
