= Tauzin =

Tauzin is a surname. Notable people with the surname include:

- Billy Tauzin (born 1943), American lobbyist and politician
- Billy Tauzin III (born 1973), American politician
- Henri Tauzin (1879–1918), French athlete
- Louis Tauzin (1842-1915), French painter
- Louis-Eugène Tauzin (1882–?), French sculptor; son of Louis Tauzin
- Lucas Tauzin (born 1998), French rugby union footballer
- Mario Tauzin (1909–1979), French artist
