= Marie-Thérèse Dethan-Roullet =

French artist

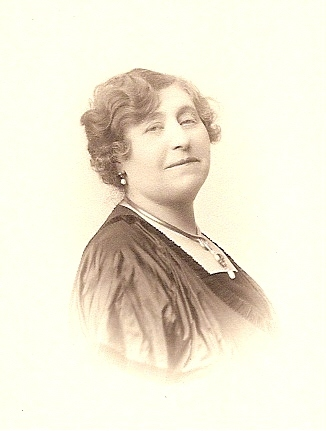
- Photography of Marie-Thérèse Dethan-Roullet
- Born: Marie-Thérèse Virginie Pauline Roullet; 24 February 1870; Ars-en-Ré
- Died: 22 October 1945 (aged 75); 17th arrondissement of Paris
- Resting place: Père Lachaise Cemetery
- Known for: Painting, Watercolor painting

Marie-Thérèse Dethan-Roullet, born Marie-Thérèse Virginie Pauline Roullet on 24 February 1870 in Ars-en-Ré and died on 22 October 1945 in the 17th arrondissement of Paris, was a French watercolourist and painter who specialised in floral motifs.

She was the niece of Gaston Roullet, official painter of the French navy, and the second cousin of the painter Jules Noël.

== Biography ==
Marie-Thérèse Virginie Pauline Roullet was born in Ars-en-Ré (Charente-Maritime) in 1870, the daughter of Marie-Thérèse Dexam (1848–1917) and Ernest Émile Roullet (1842–1919), a merchant. Her family was well-off.

She was a pupil of her uncle Gaston Roullet and of François Rivoire.

In February 1900, while her father was working as an engineer in Constantinople, she married pharmacist Georges Auguste Dethan and took the artist name Marie-Thérèse Dethan-Roullet. In 1904, she gave birth to a son.

She lived in Paris, on Rue Alphonse-de-Neuville (17th arrondissement), where she had an artist's studio on the top floor of her husband's mansion. She also had an artist's studio in their home in Chérence, a small commune just above La Roche-Guyon and close to Giverny and Vétheuil.

She was a member of the Union des Femmes Peintres et Sculpteurs and the Association de Jeunes Artistes, and participated in the salons of the Union des Femmes Peintres et Sculpteurs from 1901 to 1939 and those of the Société des artistes français in 1903 and 1936. She exhibited from 1901 to 1939.

In 1914, she was appointed Officier d'Académie.

In the 1920s and 1930s, she travelled extensively in France, but also in Italy, Sicily and Belgium (Bruges). She brought back numerous watercolours and drawings. Her favourite subjects were still lifes, landscapes and flower arrangements. Despite her many travels, she always retained a special affection for her native region and for Normandy, particularly Honfleur.

She published two collections of drawings, one in 1933 about Siena and one in 1935 about Honfleur, with an extensive foreword by her husband, Georges Auguste Dethan.

She died in Paris in 1945, in the 17th arrondissement, seventeen days after her husband. She was buried in the Père-Lachaise Cemetery.

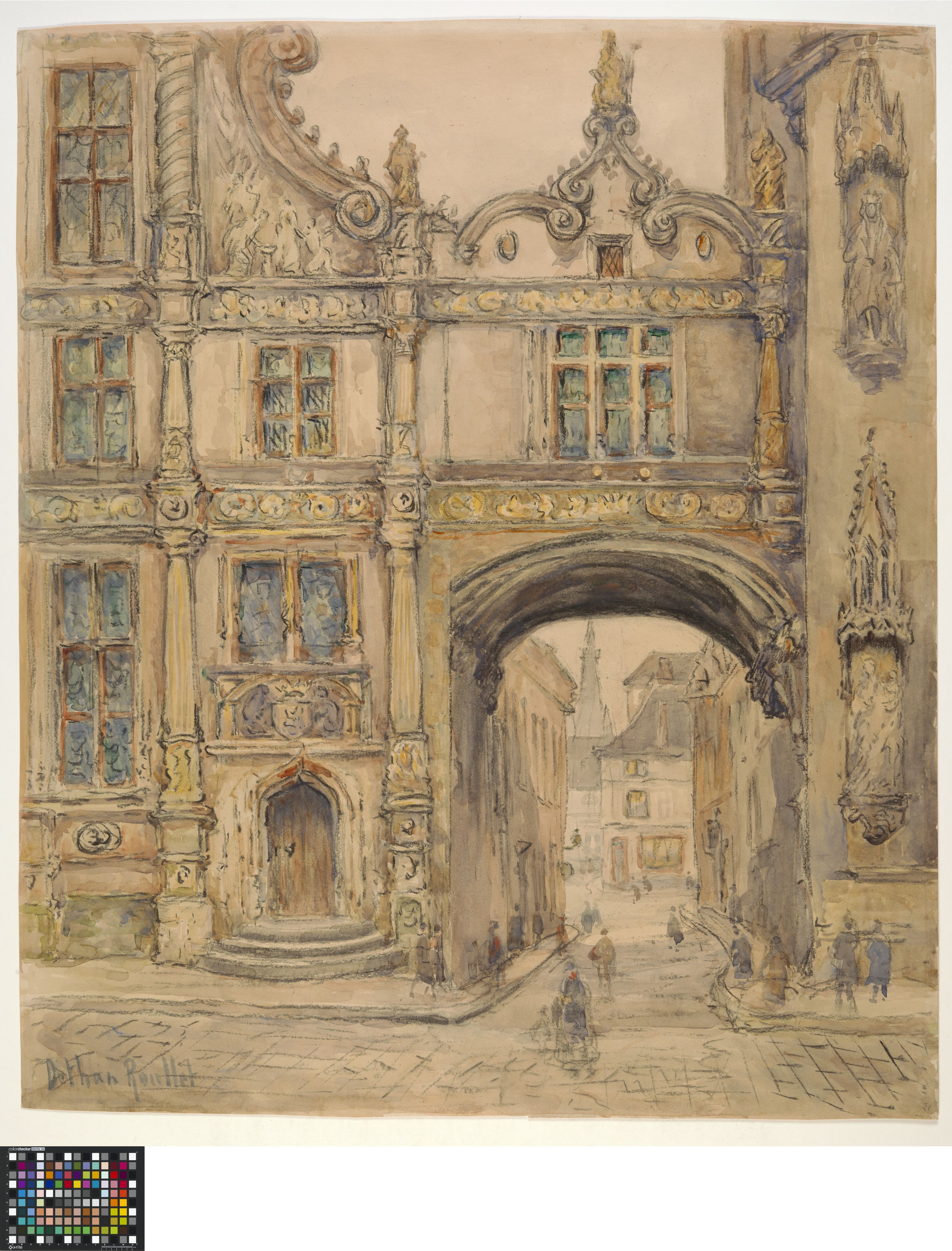
De griffie te Brugge (ca. 1870 until 1945), Marie-Thérèse Dethan Roullet, collection Musea Brugge

In 2000, a major retrospective exhibition was dedicated to her in Brescia, Italy. Murillo Azzini said of her: "In the tradition of late Impressionism, she also paints still lifes and especially flowers with a sense of the beating of the heart, of colour in light. The attention to the passing of time, to the light that fades and changes the matter of things, the tender melancholy".

Numerous auctions of her watercolours and drawings were organised: in Lyon in 1989 (Anaf), at Drouot Paris in 1990 (Tajan), in Versailles in 1990 and 1992 (Machoir & Bailly), in Valence in 2007 (auction house), with the price of her watercolours ranging from €1,000 to over €2,000. The work De griffie te Brugge is part of the collection of Musea Brugge.

== Exhibitions ==
- 1901 until 1939: Salon de l'Union des Femmes Peintres et Sculpteurs.
- 1902 until 1907: Galerie Georges Petit, exhibition by female artists.
- 1903: Salon de la Société des artistes français.
- 1906 until 1908: Galerie Georges Petit, exhibition by the Société internationale d'aquarellistes.
- 190? : Société nationale d'horticulture: Salon de peinture des fleurs.
- 1912, 1914 and 1920: Galerie Charles Brunner, exhibition by the Société de la miniature, de l'aquarelle et des arts précieux.
- 1933: Galerie d'art du Journal, exhibition by Marie-Thérèse Dethan-Roullet, watercolourist, Raymond Brechenmacher, René Cottet, Pedro de Predals, painters, and Henri Proszynski, sculptor.
- 1933: Le Salon de la Société des artistes français, exhibition at Grand-Palais in Paris.
- 1934: Galerie d'art du Journal, exhibition by Marie-Thérèse Dethan-Roullet, watercolourist, Raymond Brechenmacher, painter, Marbury Somervell, etcher, and Mrs Proszynska, mosaic artist.
- 1934: Le Salon de la Société des artistes français, exhibition at Grand-Palais in Paris.
- 1935: Galerie d'art du Journal, exhibition by Marie-Thérèse Dethan-Roullet, watercolourist, Raymond Brechenmacher, painter, René Cottet, engraver, and Henri Proszynski, sculptor.
- 1935: Rétrospective spéciale de 1935 de L'Union des Femmes Peintres et Sculpteurs.
- 1937: Dethan-Roullet, Six mois à Bruges, Galerie de la Toison d’or, Brussel
- 1939: Salon van de Société des artistes français.

== Prizes and awards ==
- 1908: Prix Guérinot, awarded by the jury of the Union des femmes peintres et sculpteurs.
- 1939: Silver medal from the Salon de la Société des artistes français.

== Publications ==
- 1933: Impressions de Sienne, 29 charcoal drawings.
- 1935: Impressions d'Honfleur, collection of 21 original drawings, in-8°, Paris, Librairie Guerlet, text by Georges Auguste Dethan.

== Bibliography ==
- François Lascoux, Marie-Thérèse Roullet. Paesaggi e nature morte, Olivieri, 2000.
- Murillo Azzini, article published on 21 October 2000 in Il Giornale di Breschia.
- Marie-Thérèse Dethan-Roullet, in Dominique Bougerie, Honfleur et les Honfleurais, cinq siècles d'histoire, volume V, published by Marie Honfleur 2005.
- Marie-Thérèse Dethan-Roullet, in François Wiehn, Dictionnaire des peintres de Charente-Maritime, Geste éditions 2016, pp. 106–107.
