= Henri Proszynski =

French sculptor (1887–1968)

Henri Louis Bolestas Proszynski
- Born: April 19, 1887; Pau, France
- Died: December 9, 1968 (aged 81); Nogent-sur-Marne, France
- Resting place: Nogent-sur-Marne, France
- Known for: Monuments
- Father: Stanislaw Proszynski
- Awards: Order of the Legion Honneur, Chevalier

Signature
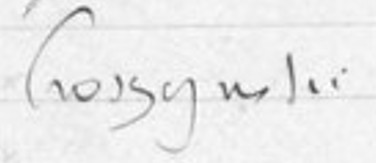

Henri Proszynski (1887-1968) was a prominent French statuary sculptor, known for his monumental works and war memorial realizations, especially in south-western France.

== Life ==
=== Family ===
Henri's grandfather was Józef Prószynski, a Polish refugee, who married Clémence Victoire de Saint Germain. She died when giving birth to Ignace (or Ignacy), Henri's father.

Henri's mother was Aline Louise Carré (deceased before 1918). Aline's brother, Louis, was an industrial entrepreneur at Clichy, near Paris.

Henri's father was Ignace Boleslas Proszynski, born on 24 August 1837, in Carentan. Ignace has been attending the Ecole Polonaise de Paris for ten years (1846-1856) He graduated from the École nationale des ponts et chaussées as an engineer in 1861.

Ignace Proszynski was then employed by the Ministère de la Marine et des Colonies in many places: Lorient (1861 and 1868), the Réunion island (1863), Moissac (1870), Oloron (1871), Pau (1872). At the end of the 1890s, he settled in the south of France, near the Pyrenees mountains: he bought the 13^{th} century castle of Crampagna, which he inhabited during his retirement. Henri's father managed several projects in this region:

- urban works in the city of Pau, following the plan of engineer Adolphe Alphand (1890-1891);
- expansion of the railway network in the departement of Ariege, in the vicinity of Foix.

Ignace was awarded the rank of Chevalier de l'Ordre de la Légion d'honneur (Knight in the Order of the Legion of Honor) on 10 August 1875.

According to archives sources, Aline and Ignace had also another son, George, a lawyer in Nogent-sur-Marne, who was Henri's witness at his wedding.

== Henri Louis ==
=== Biography ===
Henri was born in Pau, on 19 April 1887. His father lived in a villa along the Gave de Pau.

Following his father's consecutive relocations, Henri studied at the high school in Foix.

In the late 1900s, he moved to Paris, at 7 Belloni street (now Rue d'Arsonval). At the time, the area was already housing other artists, such as painters Charles Polowetski, Bernard Gussow and the sculptor Jacob Epstein. In the French capital, he studied under the direction of Jules Coutan.

Proszynski was mobilized on the front during WWI. As a veteran, he received after the war several official commissions for war memorials in the department of Ariège where he lived.

Henri married Marie Poplasko in Paris, on 9 July 1918, while still being a conscript. Marie was born on 8 June 1883, in Russia, from Nicolas Poplasko and Emilie Koscinska.

Henri regularly lived in the castle of Crampagna that his father bought at the end of the 19^{th} century. He also worked there from time to time. He died on 9 December 1968, in Nogent-sur-Marne.

=== Artistic career ===
By and large, Proszynski earned his living by fulfilling official commissions, generally monumental ensembles (memorials, fountains).

From 1910 onwards, he regularly exhibited at the Salon des Artistes Français.

In April 1912, Henri became a member of the Société des Artistes Francais (French Artists Society).

At the eve of the First World War, his work was assessed as follows in the French magazine La Revue Moderne (25 January 1914):

"With its supple and vibrant modeling, its harmonious rhythm of lines, it already attests to the young artist's genuine self-mastery. Mr. Proszynski possesses a very refined intellect and demonstrates a fervent and discerning will. Since completing his artistic education, this young artist has sought subjects for his works in his native country, in the countryside where he spent his early youth. [...] Mr. Proszynski seems to me to have a brilliant artistic future."

Henri Proszynski exhibited at the Exposition du Grand Palais des Champs Elysees (Exhibition at the Grand Palais des Champs Elysees), in April 1928; he showcased two fountains in bronze, stone and marble.

Another mention of his skills were made in the magazine Art et décoration : revue mensuelle d'art moderne (Art and decoration: a monthly magazine of modern art...) in January 1932:

(Henri Proszynski)'s "craft is solid. Perhaps it is from wood that he draws his most successful works: his Falcon, with its sober and powerful lines, is reminiscent of an Egyptian sculpture; in his resting cat on the ground, passes the warm trembling of life."

In 1937, Henri became a member of the jury panel for the 1937 exhibition of the Société des Artistes Francais.

He left many of his artistic realizations in Corrèze and Ariège departments.

== Notable works ==
=== Monumental works ===
==== Commissionned war memorials ====
- In Lavelanet (November 1922), bronze; the plaster project was awarded a silver medal at the 1921 Salon des artistes français in Paris. The ensemble has been registered on the National historical Heritage list in August 2007.
- In Pamiers (1923): Four French soldiers carrying a stretcher surmounted by a statue of Victory, granite and bronze, registered on the National historical Heritage list in 2019.
- In Lézat-sur-Lèze (1927).
- In Le Fossat (1927).
- In Foix (1948): bronze medal at the base of the World War II memorial and a stone statue of the Resistance (Femme debout).

==== Works in Neuvic ====
- Fontaine Printemps or Fontaine du Berger, stone sculpture (ca 1930), city public garden.
- Fontaine de la poule or Coq de bruyère effrayant 7 canetons (A black grouse scarying 7 ducklings), bronze, stone and earthenware (1932-1937), realized with his spouse Marie, city public garden (main frame) and city museum (black grouse and ducklings).
- Eight caryatids for the main monumental entrance of the Marcel Barbanceys vocational high school (realized between 1934 and 1949), cement.

=== Other works ===
- Fontaine du chat qui pêche, marble and bronze (end 1920s).
- La fontaine au bouc (The Goat Fountain) made for the 1925 International Exhibition of Modern Decorative and Industrial Arts. The fountain is now installed in Geneva.
- Torso of Raoul Lafagette (1920s), stone, townhall of Foix.
- Female peasant (1920), wood, townhall of Pamiers.

Proszynski often realized lost-wax casting in bronze, generally portraying animals, among which:

- Sleeping cat;
- Grounded falcon;
- Magpie;
- Pekingese.

== Exhibitions and awards ==
=== Exhibitions ===
- Salon des artistes Francais (1908, while 21 years old), with his work Danseuses.
- Exposition internationale des arts et des techniques dans la vie moderne (International Exposition of Arts and Techniques in Modern Life), Paris, 1937.
- 33^{rd} exhibition of the Society of the Southern Artists (Société des Artistes Méridionaux), at the Musée des Augustins of Toulouse, from May to June 1941.

=== Awards ===
- He was awarded the rank of Knight in the order of the Legion of Honour (1934).
- Silver medal of the Salon de la societe des Artistes Francais Salon of the Society of French Artists (1921).
- Prix Palais Longchamp (1922).
- Gold medal at the Exposition Internationale des Arts Décoratifs et Industrielles modernes (1925).
- Gold medal of the Salon de la societe des Artistes Francais and Prix Colonial de la Tunisie Colonial Prize of Tunisia (1934).

Proszynski works in the city of Neuvic have been registered on the French National Heritage list in September 2013.

== Gallery ==
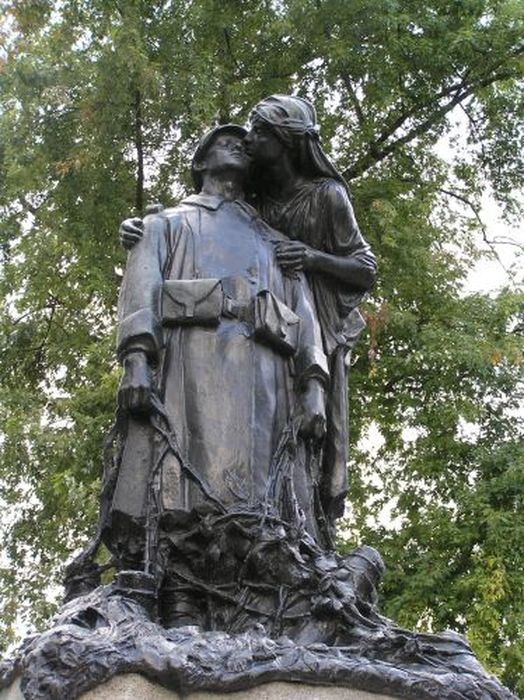
War memorial in Lavelanet

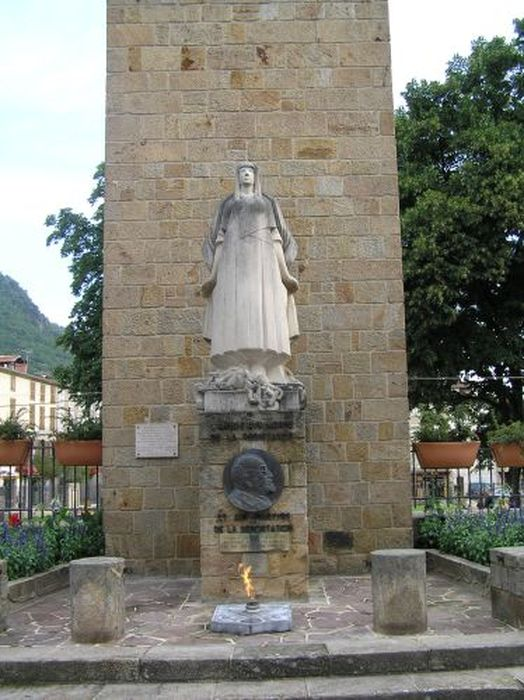
War memorial in Foix

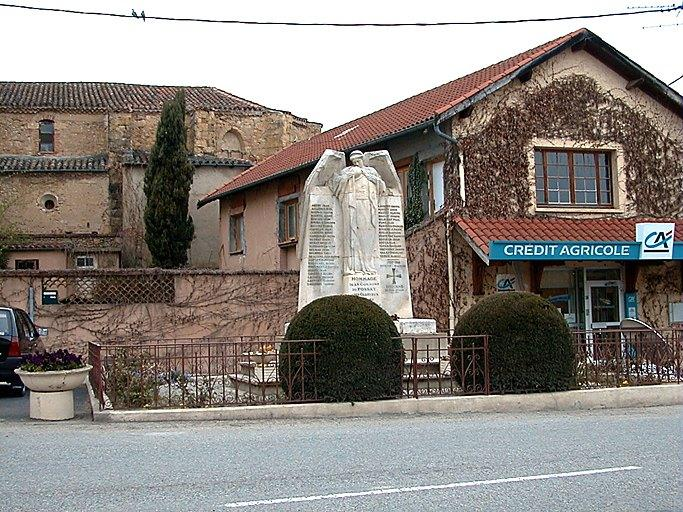
War memorial in Le Fossat

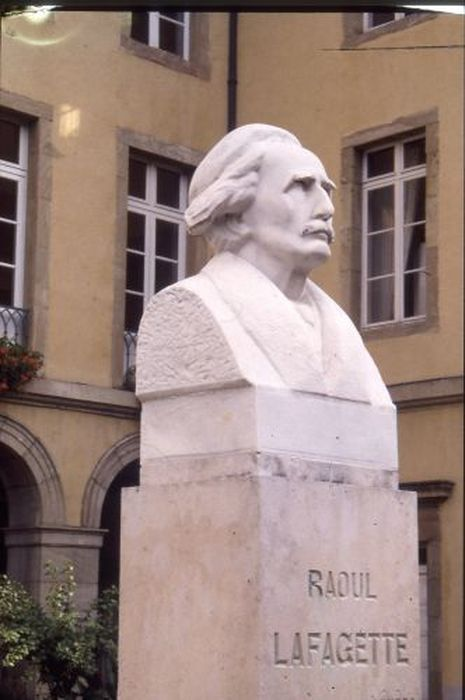
Torso of Raoul Lafagette

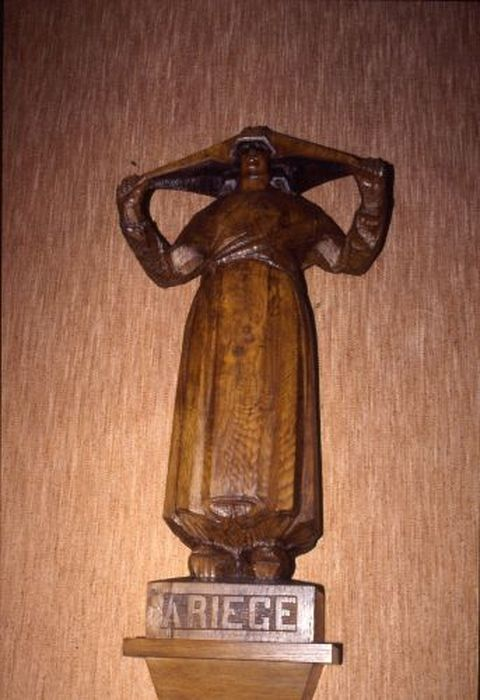
Female peasant

== See also ==
- École nationale des ponts et chaussées
- Szkoła Narodowa Polska w Paryżu
- International Exhibition of Modern Decorative and Industrial Arts
- Jules Coutan
- Château de Crampagna
- Monument aux morts de Pamiers
