= Louis Tauzin =

French painter (1842-1915)

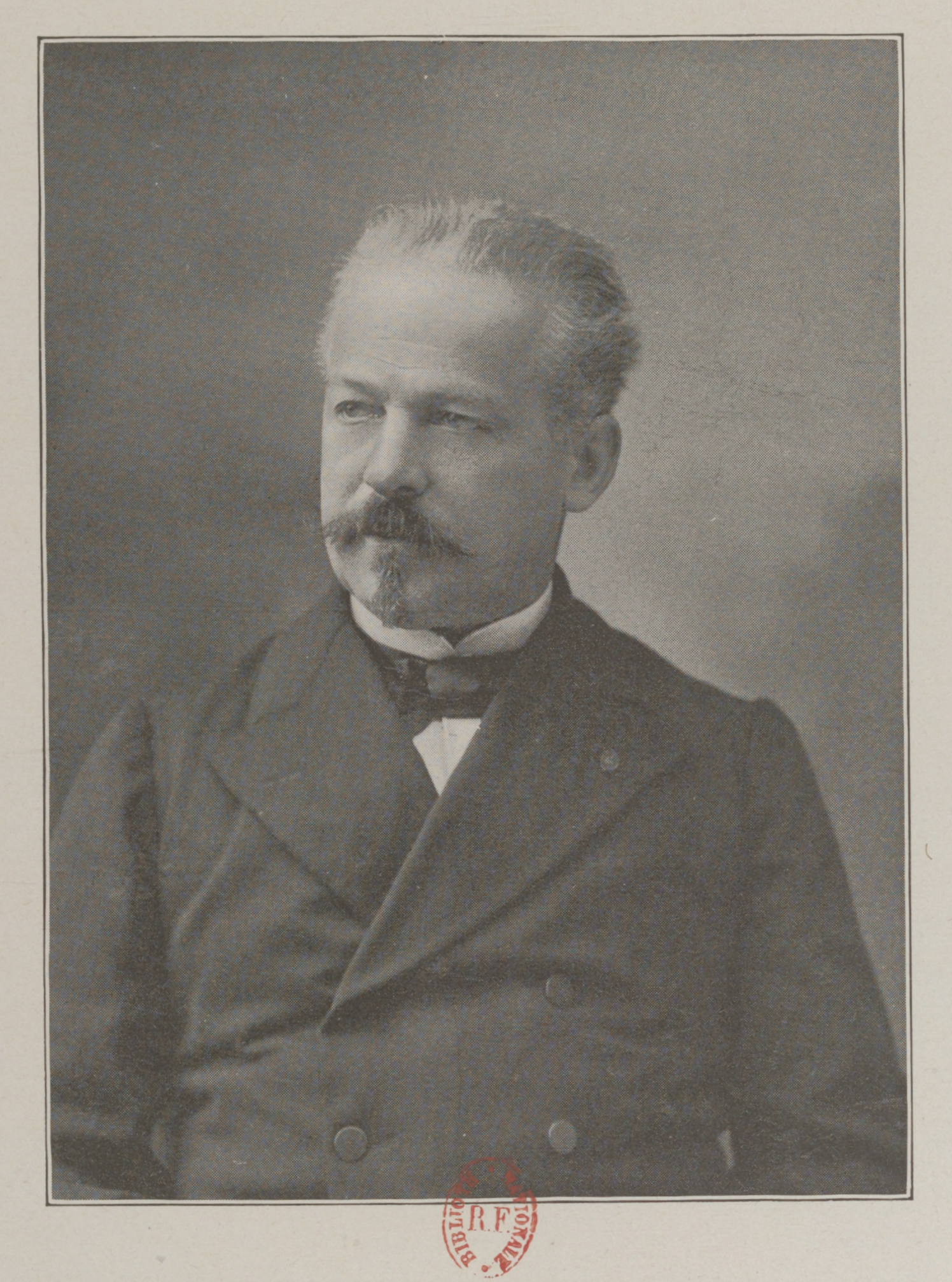
- Tauzin in a photo published in 1900
- Born: 21 July 1842; Barsac, Gironde, France
- Died: 30 August 1915 (aged 73); Royan, France
- Education: École des beaux-arts de Bordeaux
- Known for: Painting, posters
- Spouse: Marie Marguerite Zimmerman
- Children: Henri-Alexis Tauzin, Louis-Eugène Tauzin

Signature
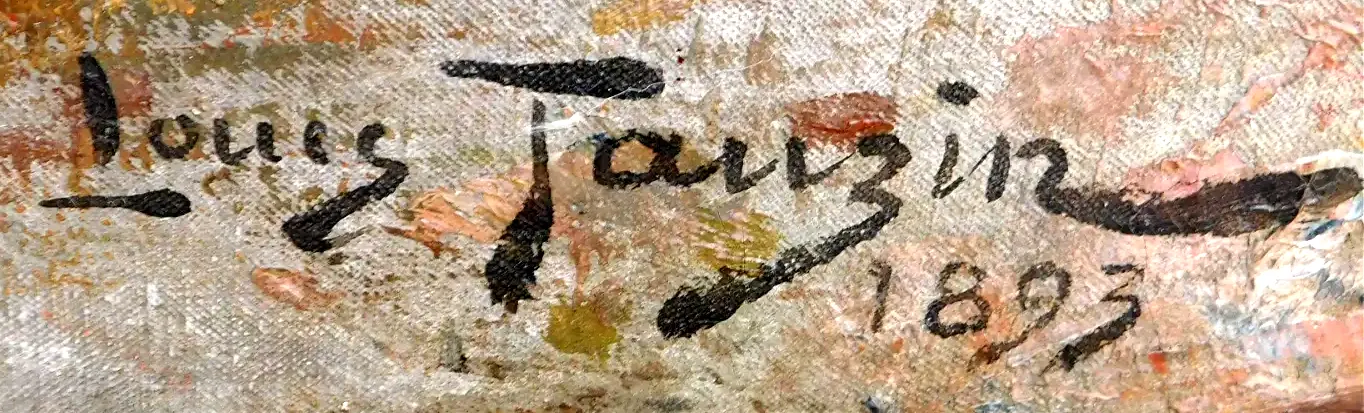

Louis Tauzin (July 21, 1842, Barsac, Gironde—August 30, 1915, Royan) was a French landscape painter, poster artist, and chromolithographer.

== Education and career ==
Louis Tauzin studied at the École des beaux-arts de Bordeaux under Jean-Marie Oscar Gué. He specialized in landscapes and seascapes. In the 45 years from 1867 to 1912, he presented 65 works at 37 of the annual Paris Salons. From 1891 he also exhibited regularly at the salon of Toulouse. At expositions in Versailles, he was awarded silver medals in 1884 and 1885.

Along with painting, Tauzin had a highly successful career as a commercial artist, eventually becoming chef d'atelier (head of studio) at Champenois, one of the most prominent chromolithography houses in Paris. He produced many posters in lithographic format for railway companies, vacation destinations, various major brands, and the publisher Éditions Rouff.

In 1889, Tauzin illustrated the covers of Paris-Revue, often with scenes from the Exposition Universelle. That same year, he produced a series of lithographs on the theme of La tombée de nuit (nightfall).

From 1900 to 1910, he painted a series of watercolors of spa towns, including Saint-Alban-les-Eaux, Évian, and Vichy, which were reproduced as postcards.

From 1905 to 1912, he provided humorous cartoons for the periodical L'Enfant, published by the Société Protectrice de l'Enfance (child protection society).

Fiercely anti-German and pro-French during World War I, Tauzin drew the masthead art and wrote a regular column for the periodical L'Antiboche and made drawings for a series of propaganda postcards published 1914–1916. (Boche is derogatory French slang for a German, especially a German soldier.)

== Personal life; death ==
Tauzin married Marie Marguerite Zimmerman on August 29, 1871, in Saint-Avold, Moselle. Their elder son, Henri-Alexis Tauzin, studied under Jean-Louis Pascal and became an architect; their younger son, Louis-Eugène Tauzin, studied under Jules Coutan and became a sculptor.

Around 1880, Louis Tauzin moved to Meudon, in the area overlooking the Seine known as Bellevue ("beautiful view"). His neighbors included Louis-Maurice Boutet de Monvel and Édouard Manet. Tauzin's paintings of the views from Bellevue were among his most notable works. The house where he lived, at 4 Sentier des Pierres-Blanches, was destroyed by a bomb during World War II. Today, the largest public collection of his paintings is held by the Musée d'art et d'histoire de Meudon.

In the last year of his life, Tauzin split his time between Paris and a villa called Les Bessons outside the town of Royan on the French Atlantic coast. Shortly after writing his last column for L'Antiboche, published August 15, 1915, Tauzin set about hanging a rope at the well at Les Bessons. A stone cover on the well gave way beneath him and he fell 25 meters. With a broken ankle, a badly damaged foot, and torn hands, he barely escaped drowning by clinging to a pipe. Neighbors, called by his wife, threw ropes to him. He was pulled from the well after much effort, complaining of severe pain. Tauzin succumbed to his injuries on 30 August 1915, at the age of 73.

== Gallery ==
=== Paintings ===
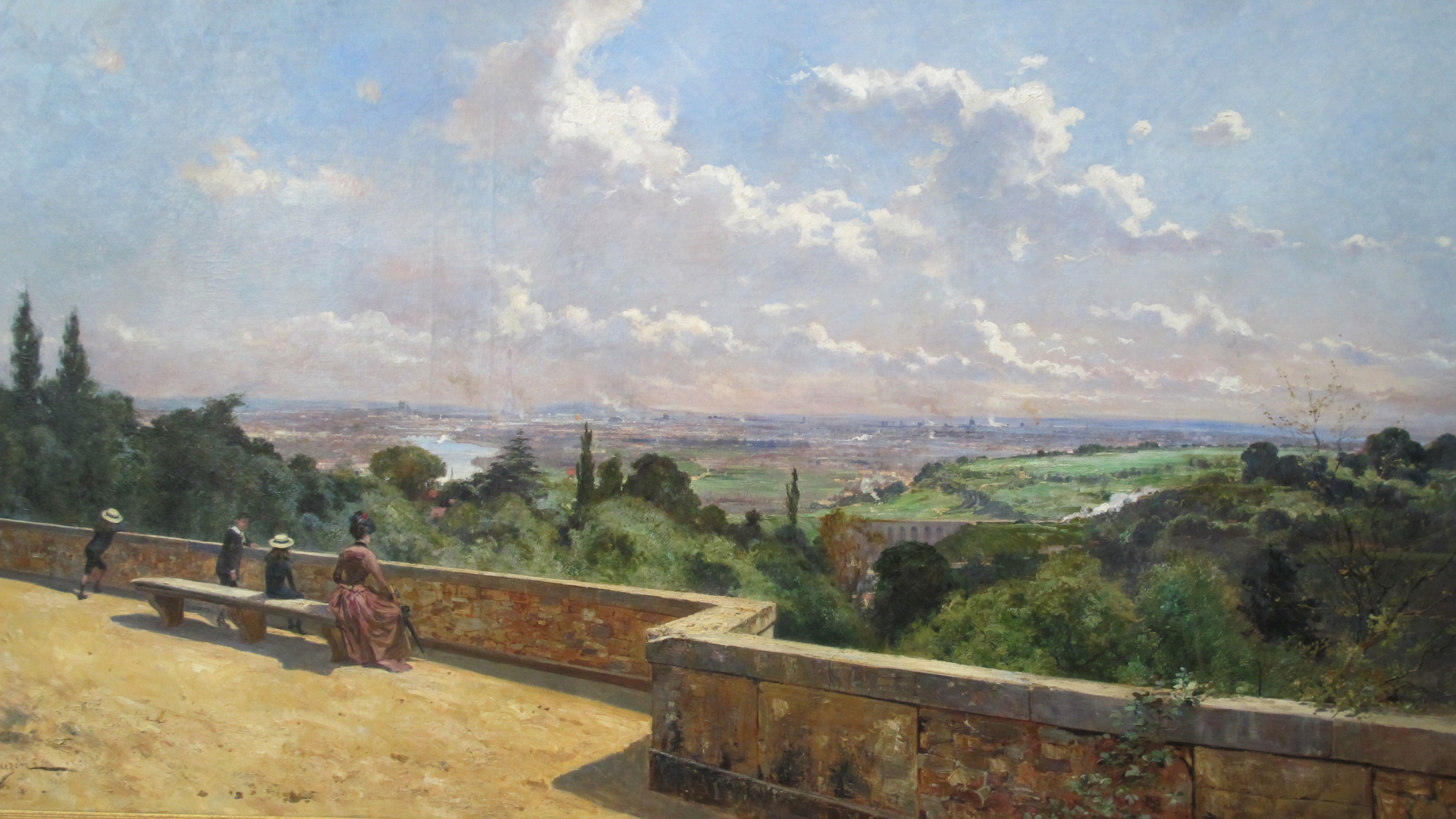
Paris en 1889 vue prise depuis la terrasse de Meudon, 1889
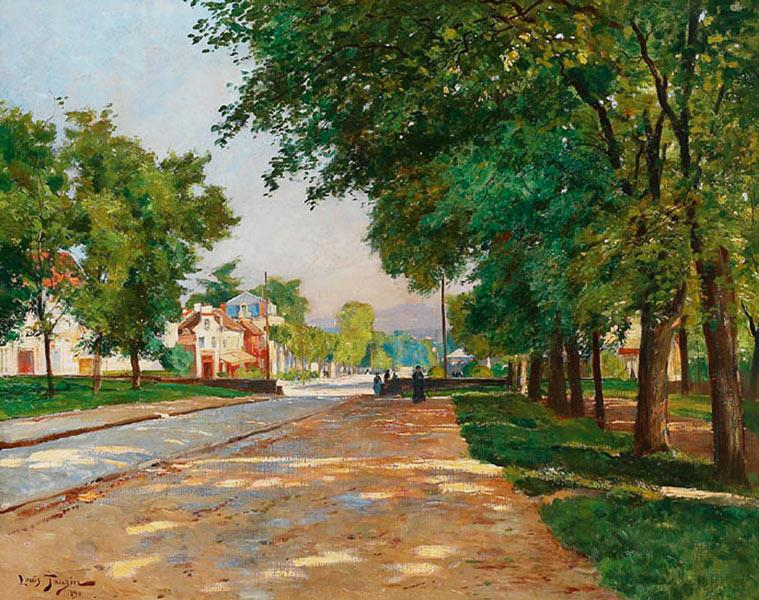
L'avenue du château, 1890

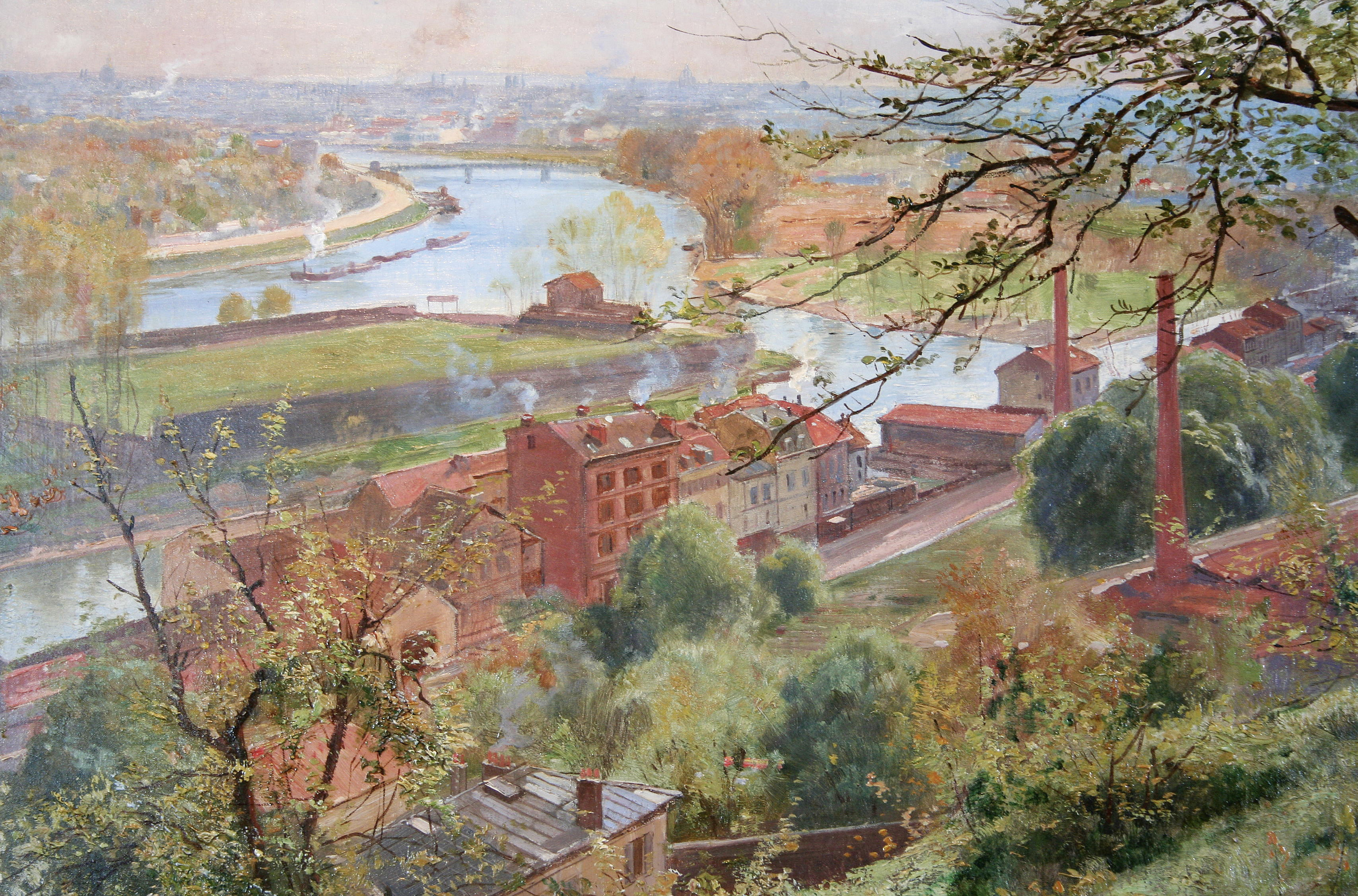
L'île Seguin vue des terrasses de Meudon, 1890

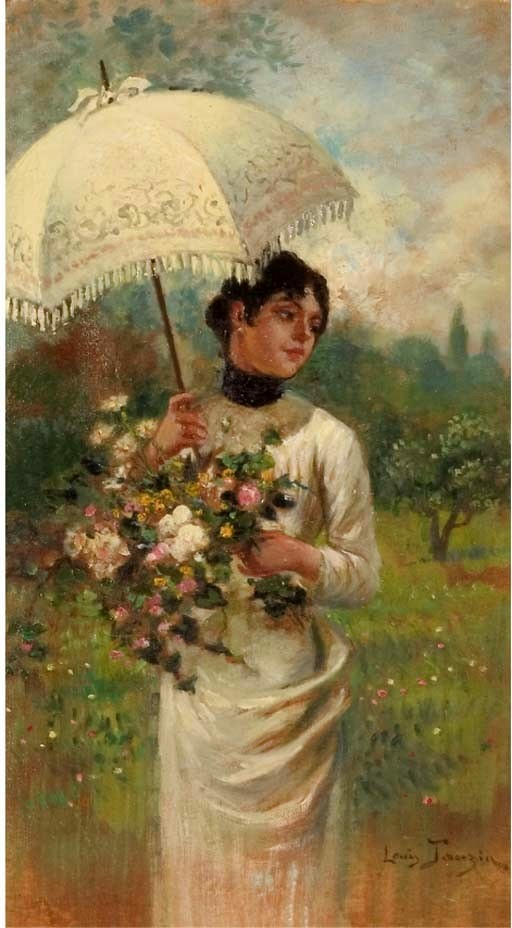
Jeune femme avec parasol, c. 1890

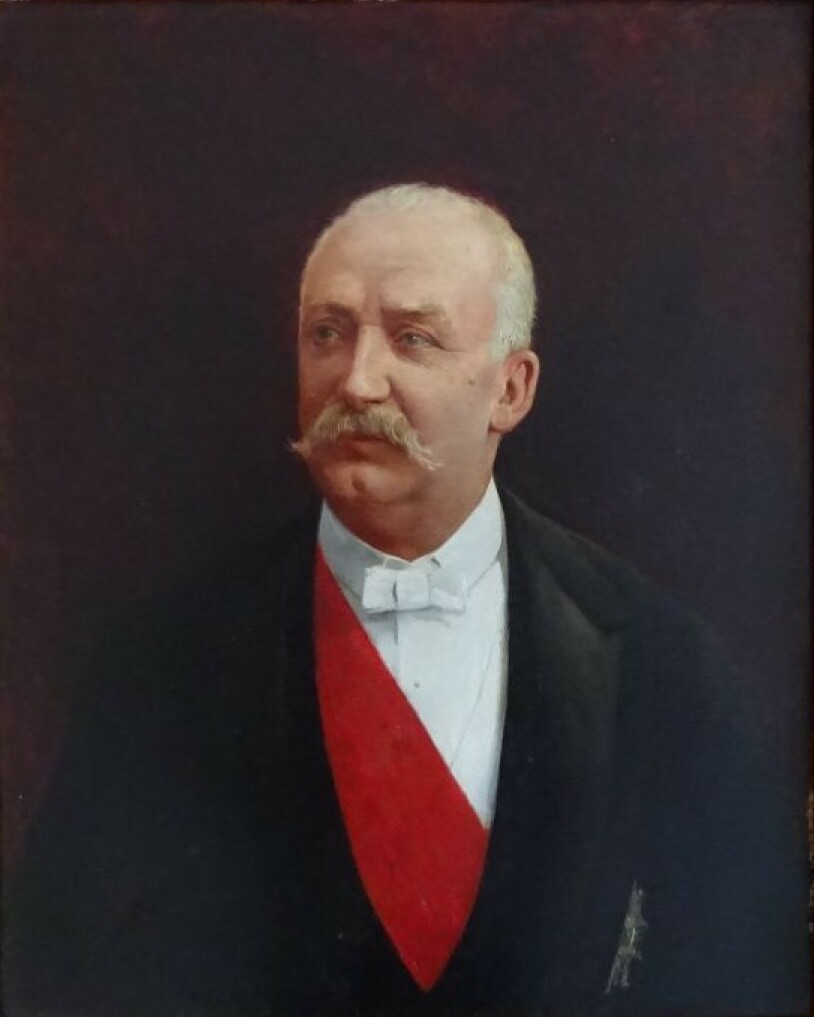
Portrait of Félix Faure, c. 1890-1900

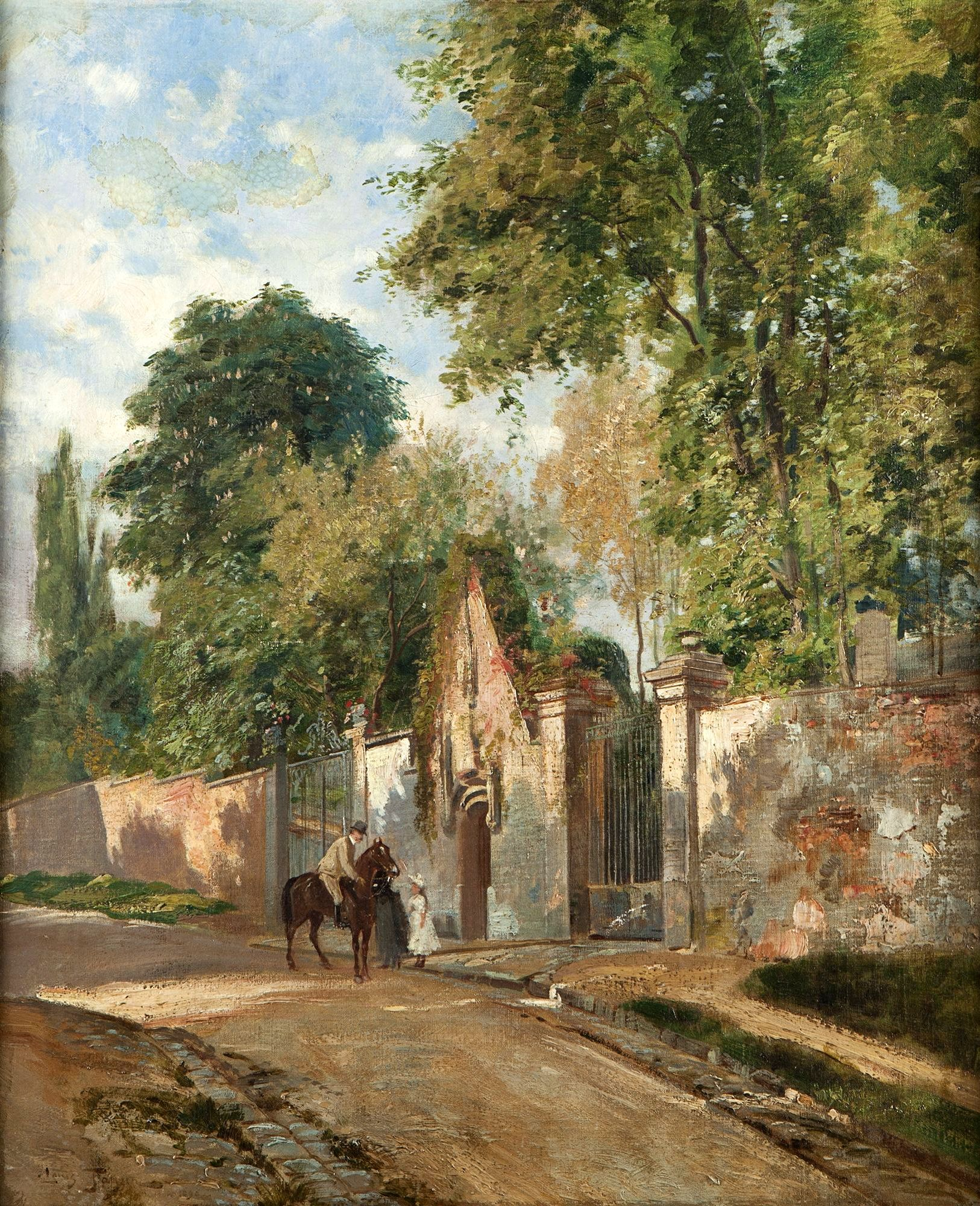
Rue des Capucines à Bellevue, c. 1890-1900

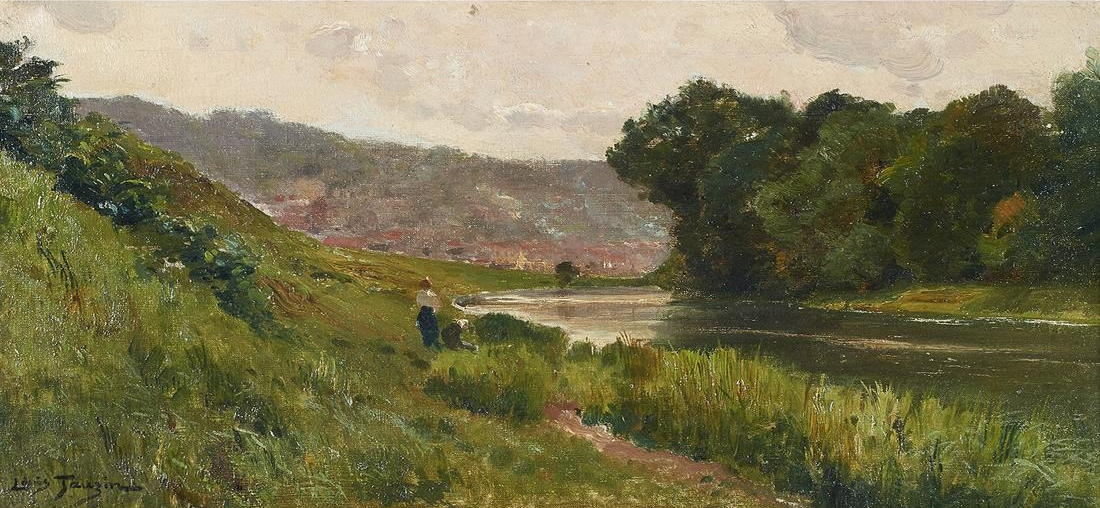
Undated landscape

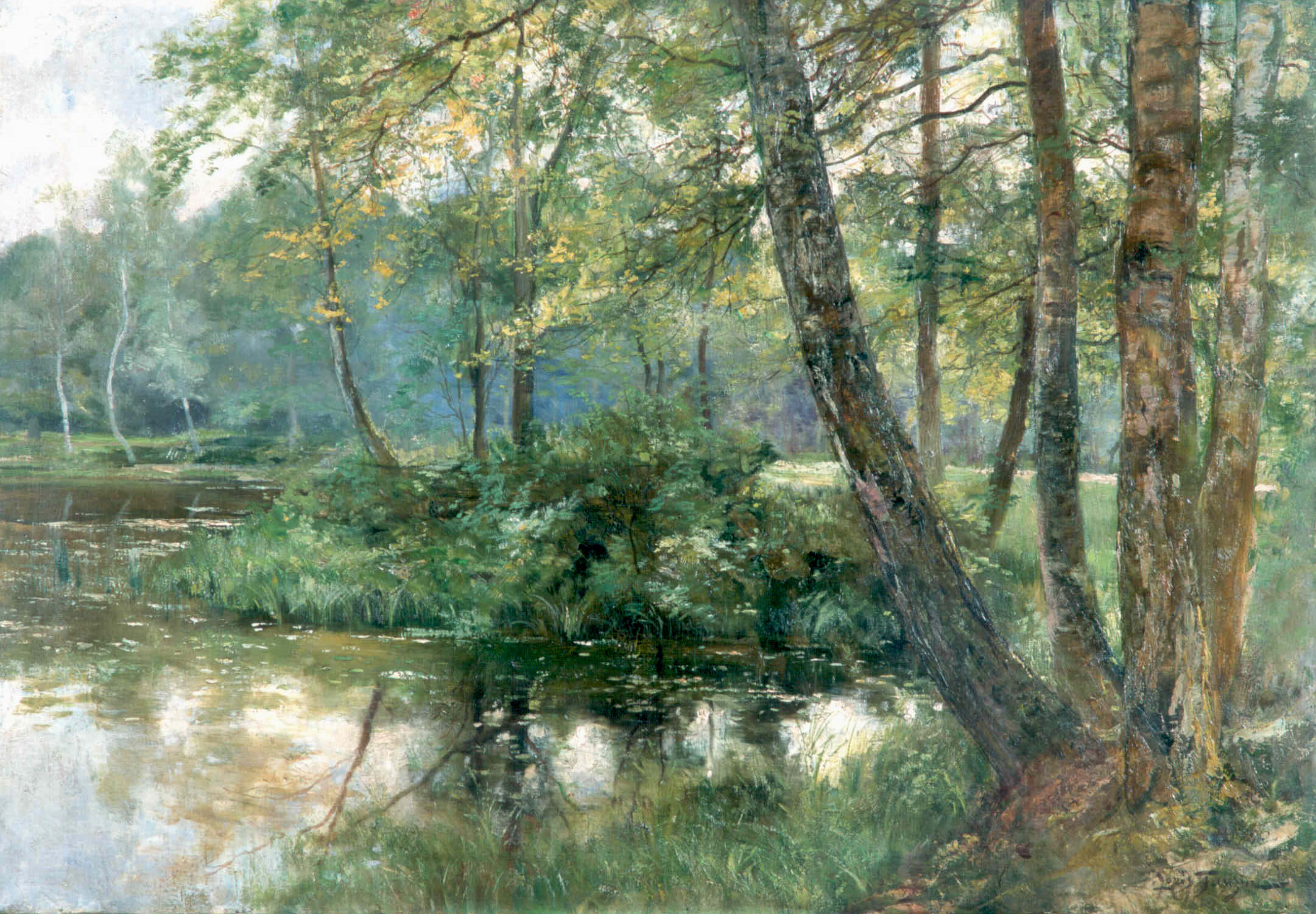
L’étang de Trivaux, undated

=== Posters ===
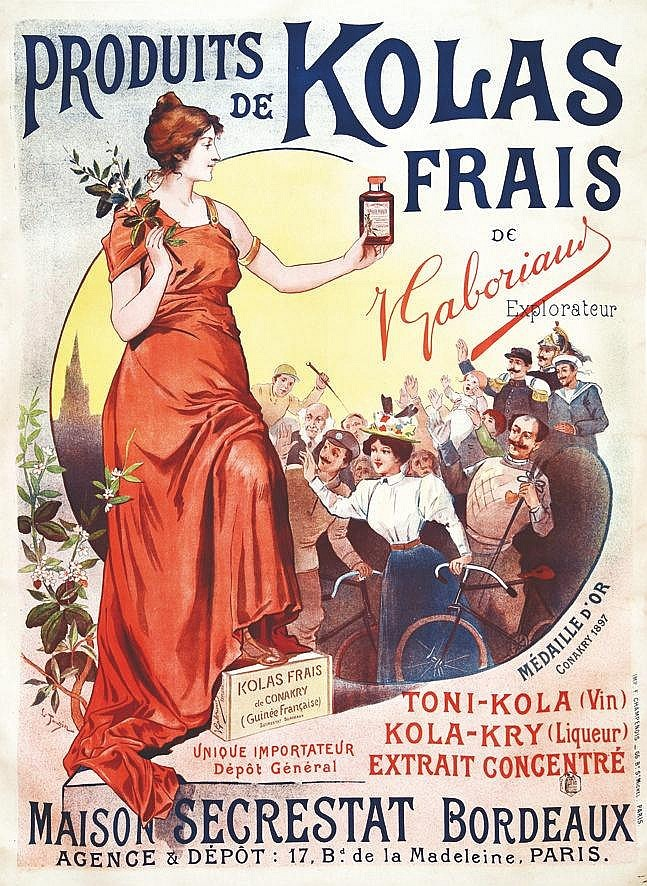
Produits de Kolas Frais, c. 1900-1910

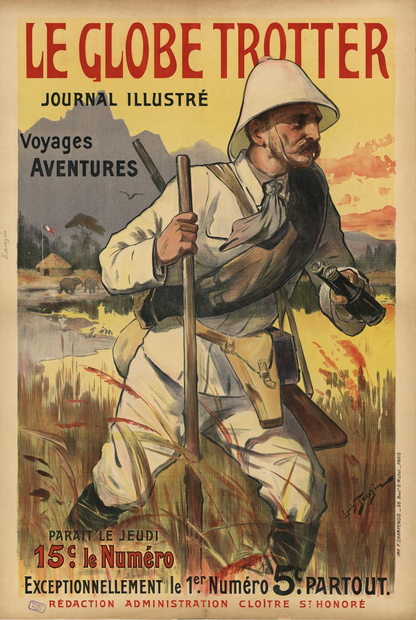
Globe Trotter, 1902

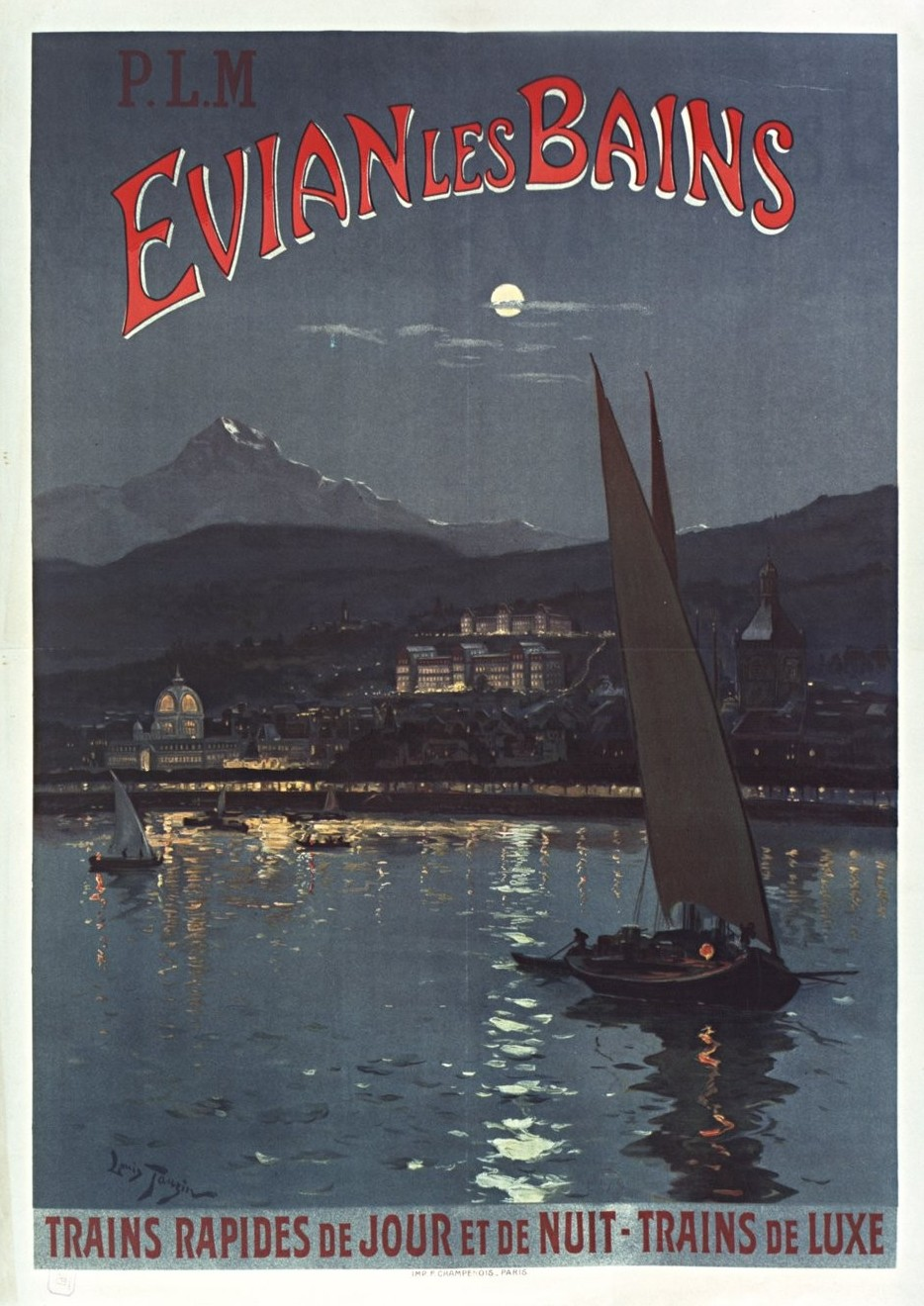
Evian les Bains, 1908

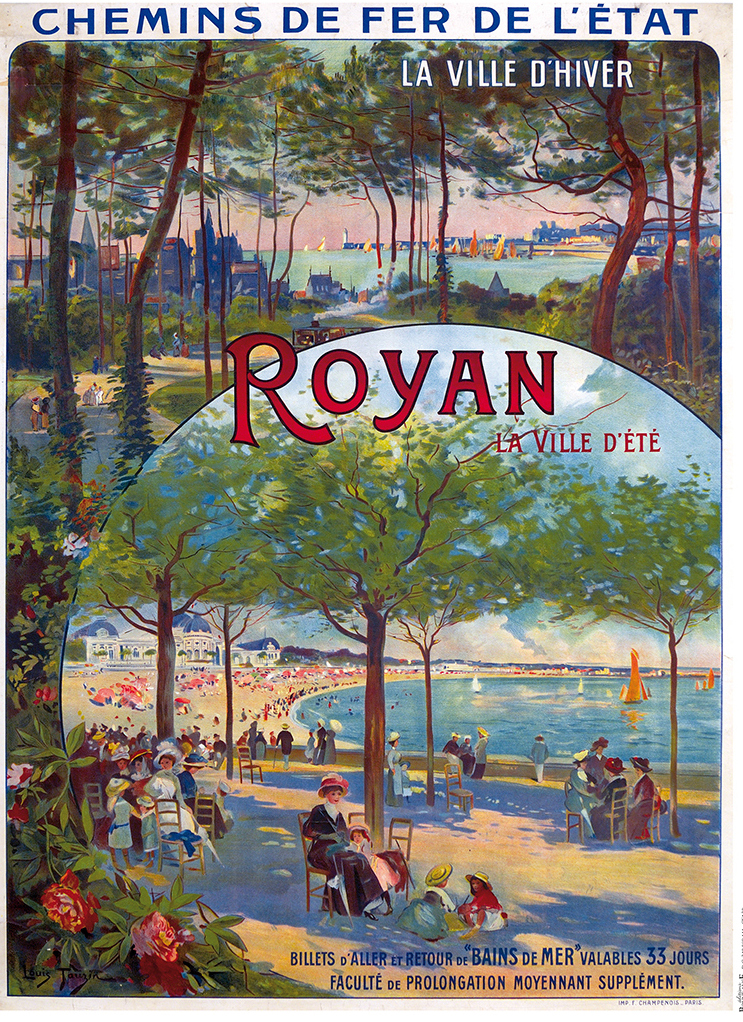
Royan, 1911

Les Vosges, 1913

=== Lithographic series La tombée de nuit, 1889 ===
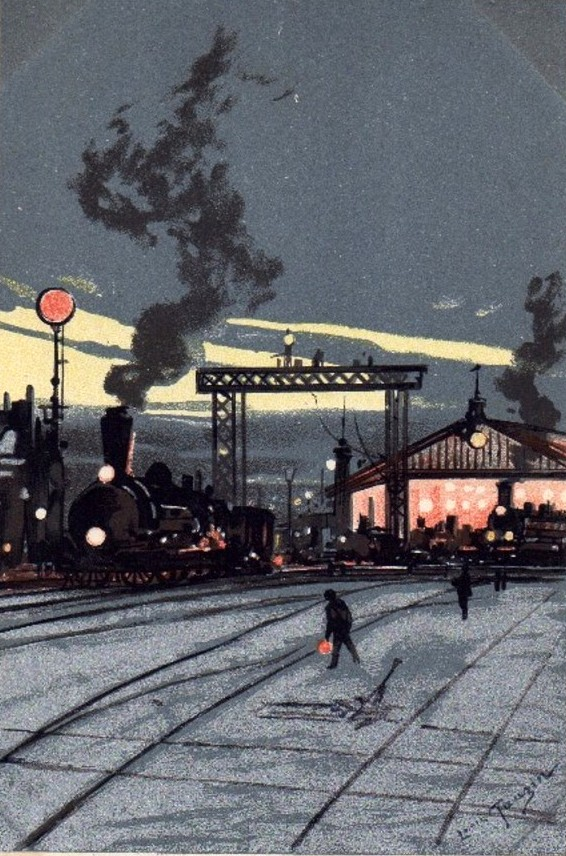

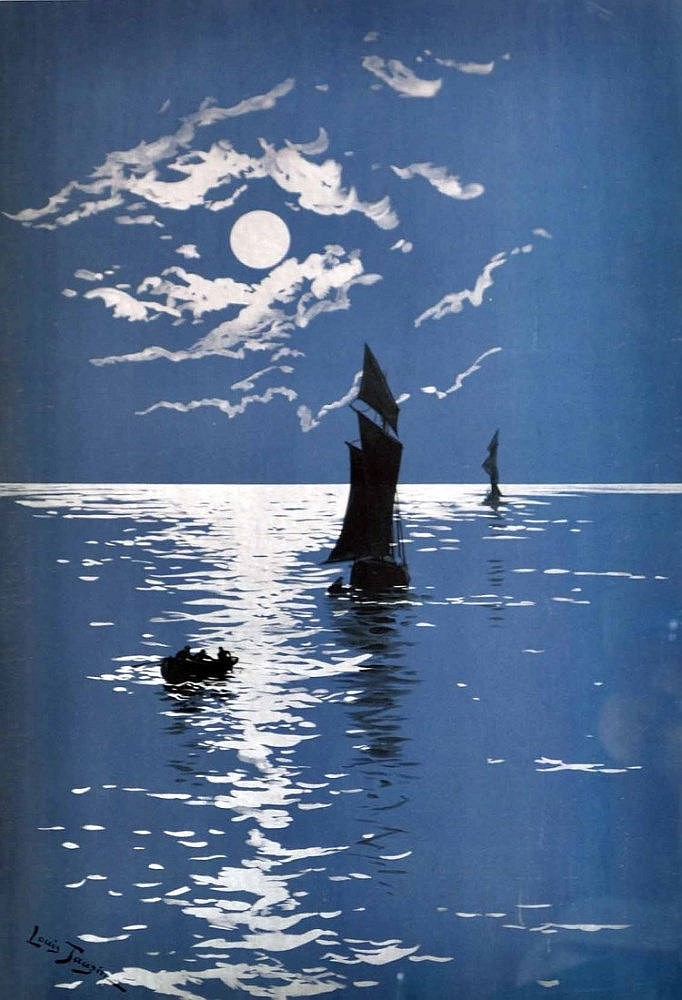

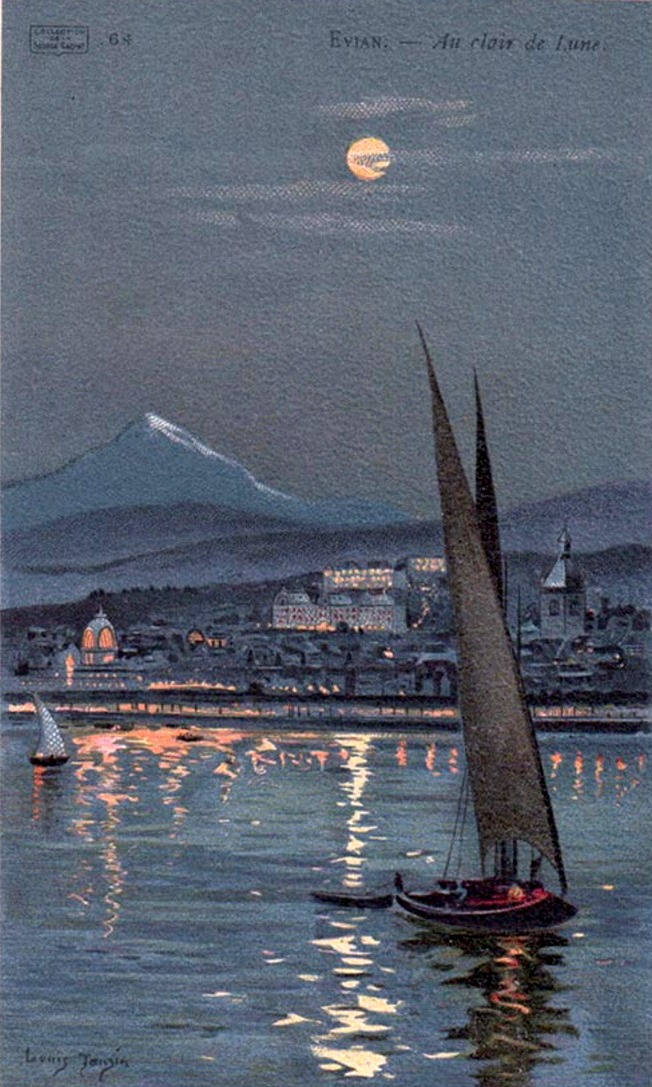

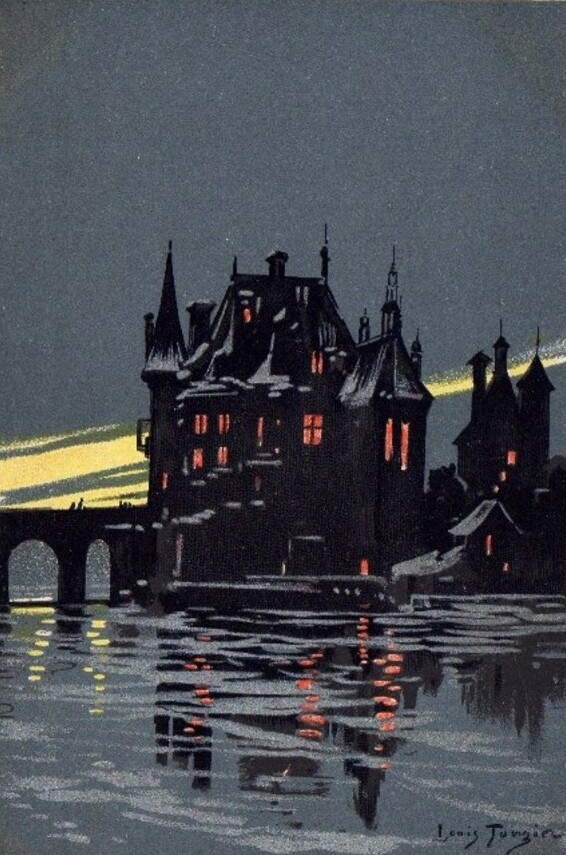

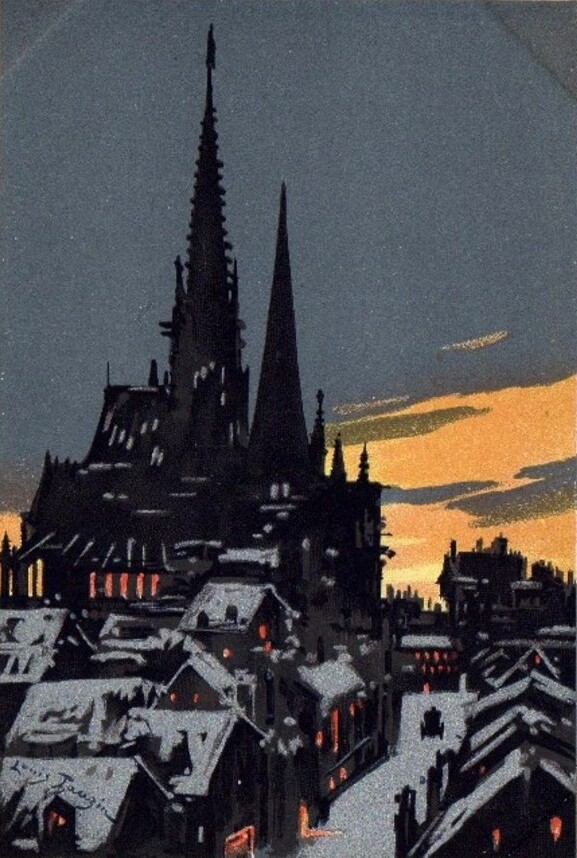

=== Spa postcards ===
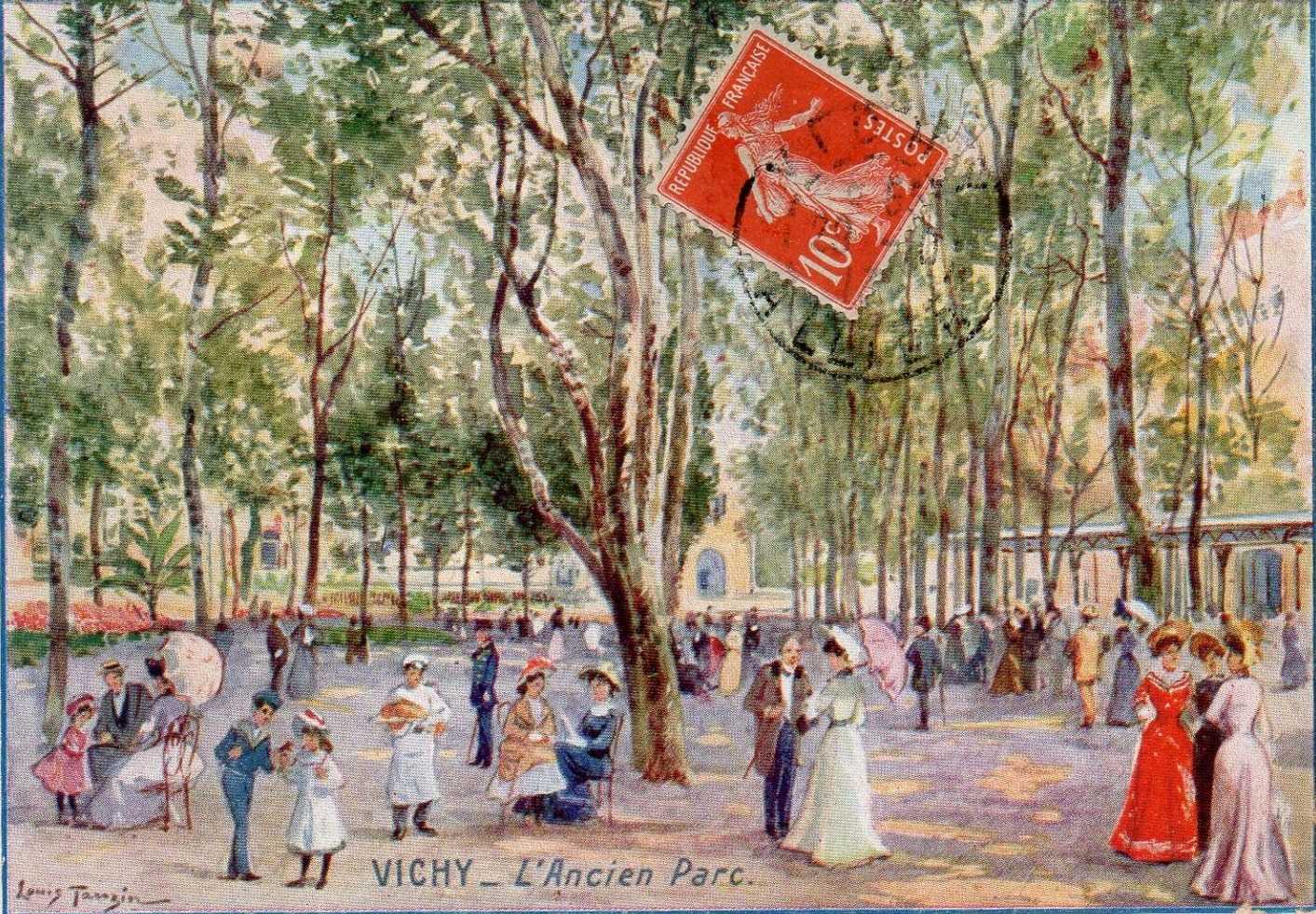

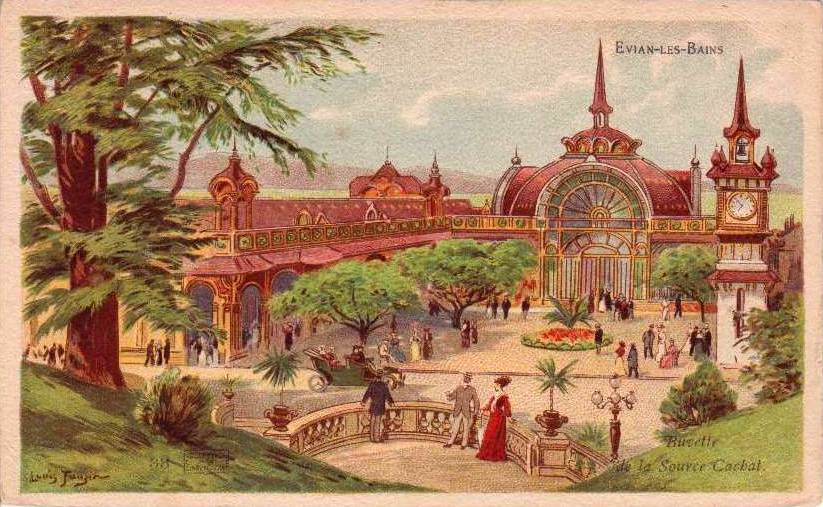

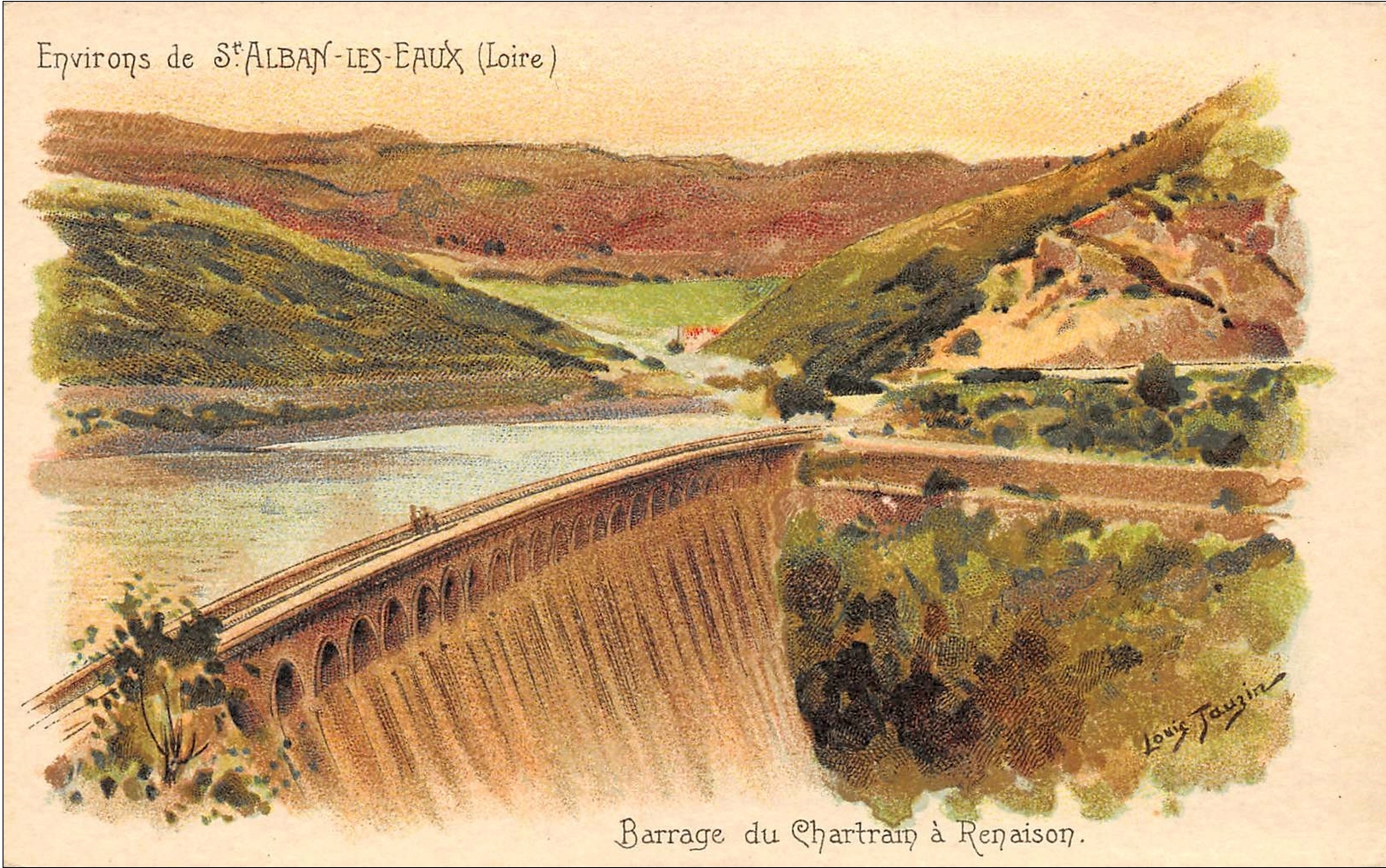

=== World War I propaganda ===
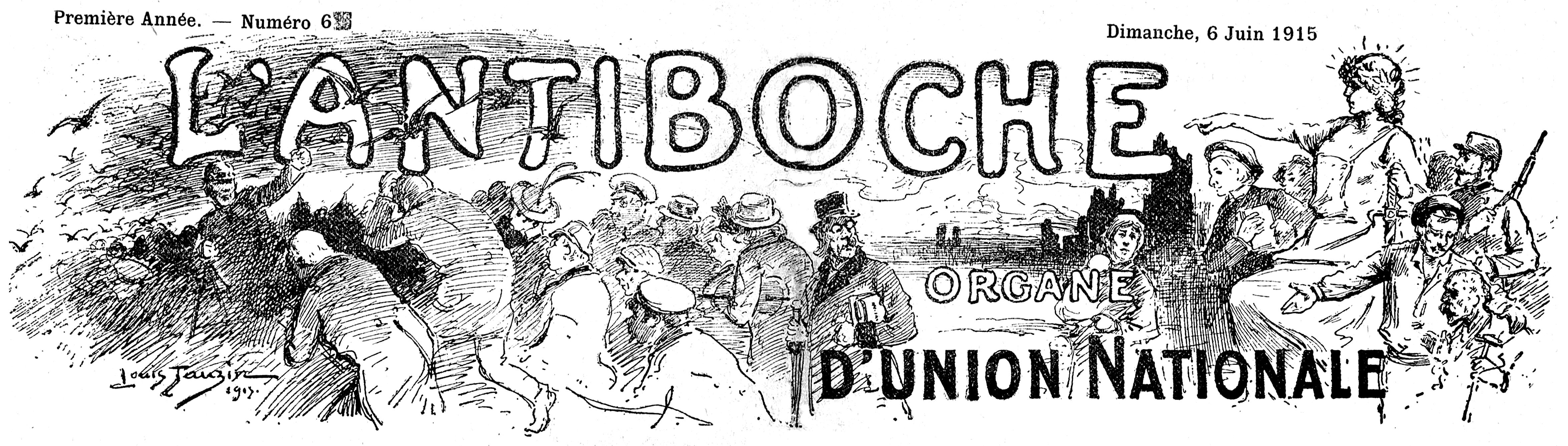
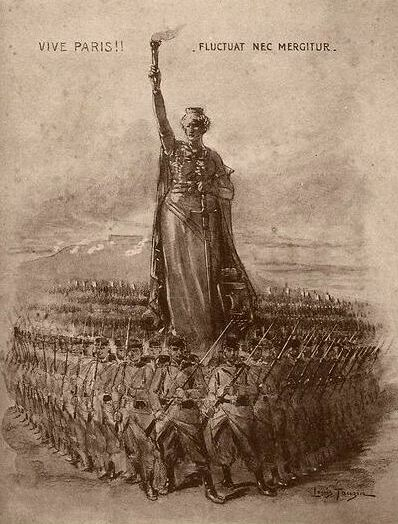

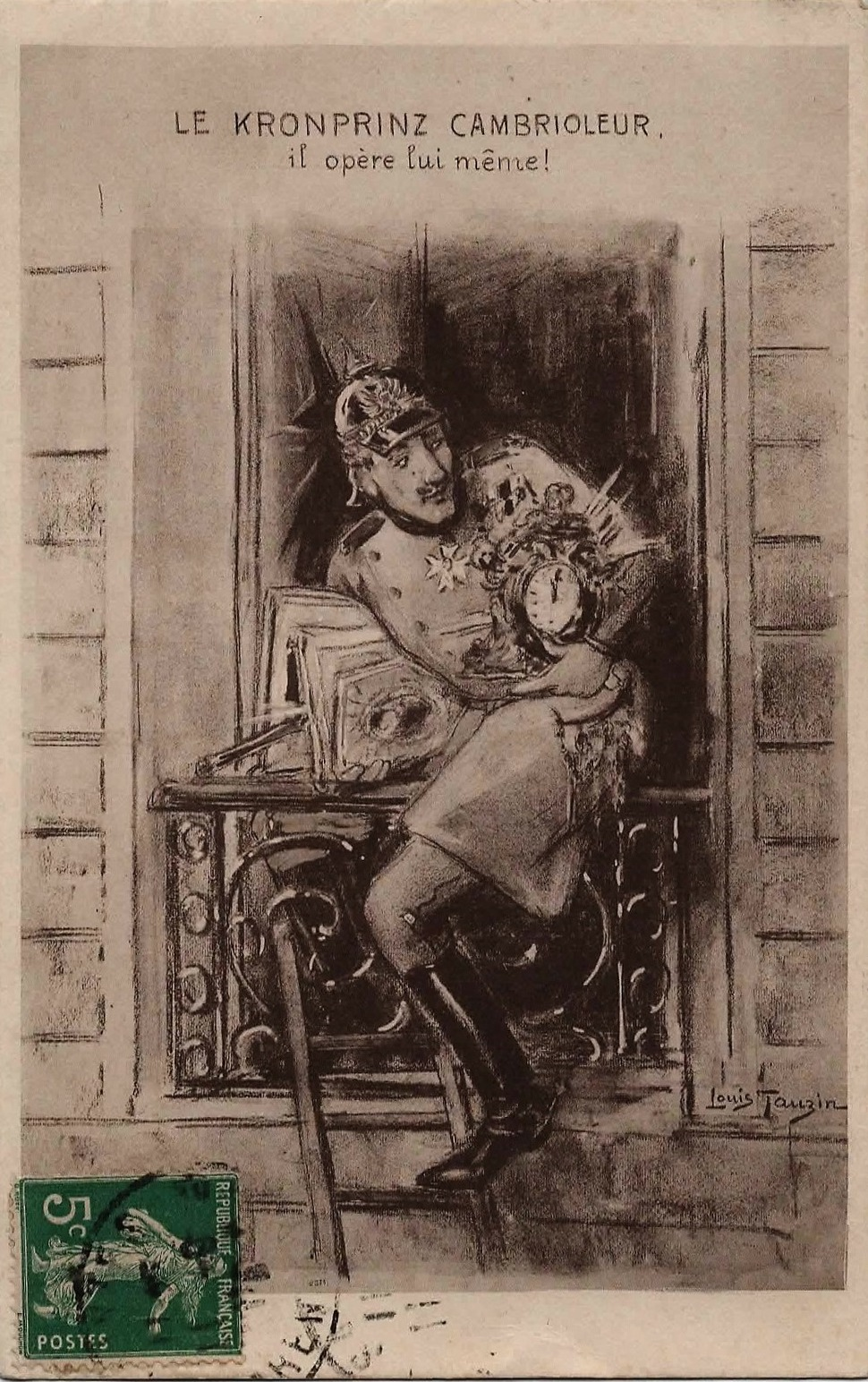

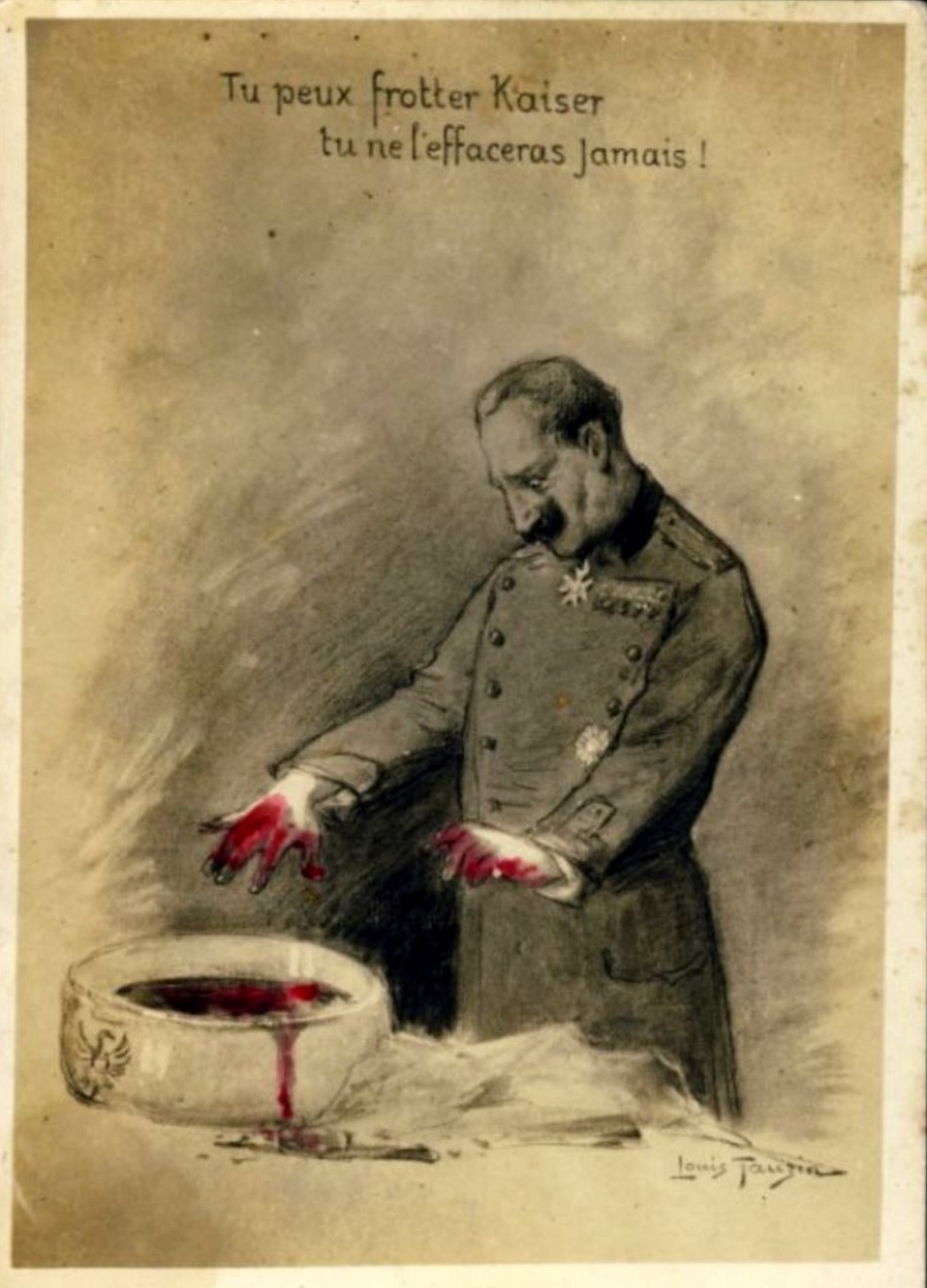

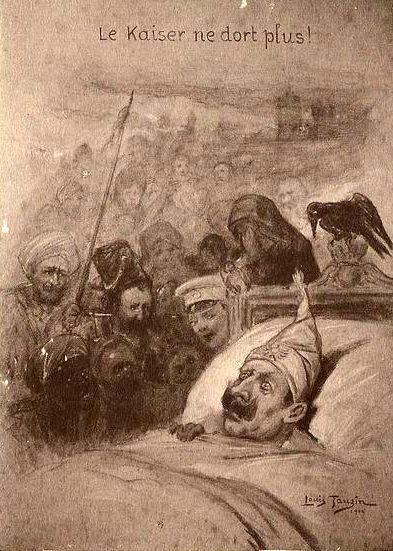

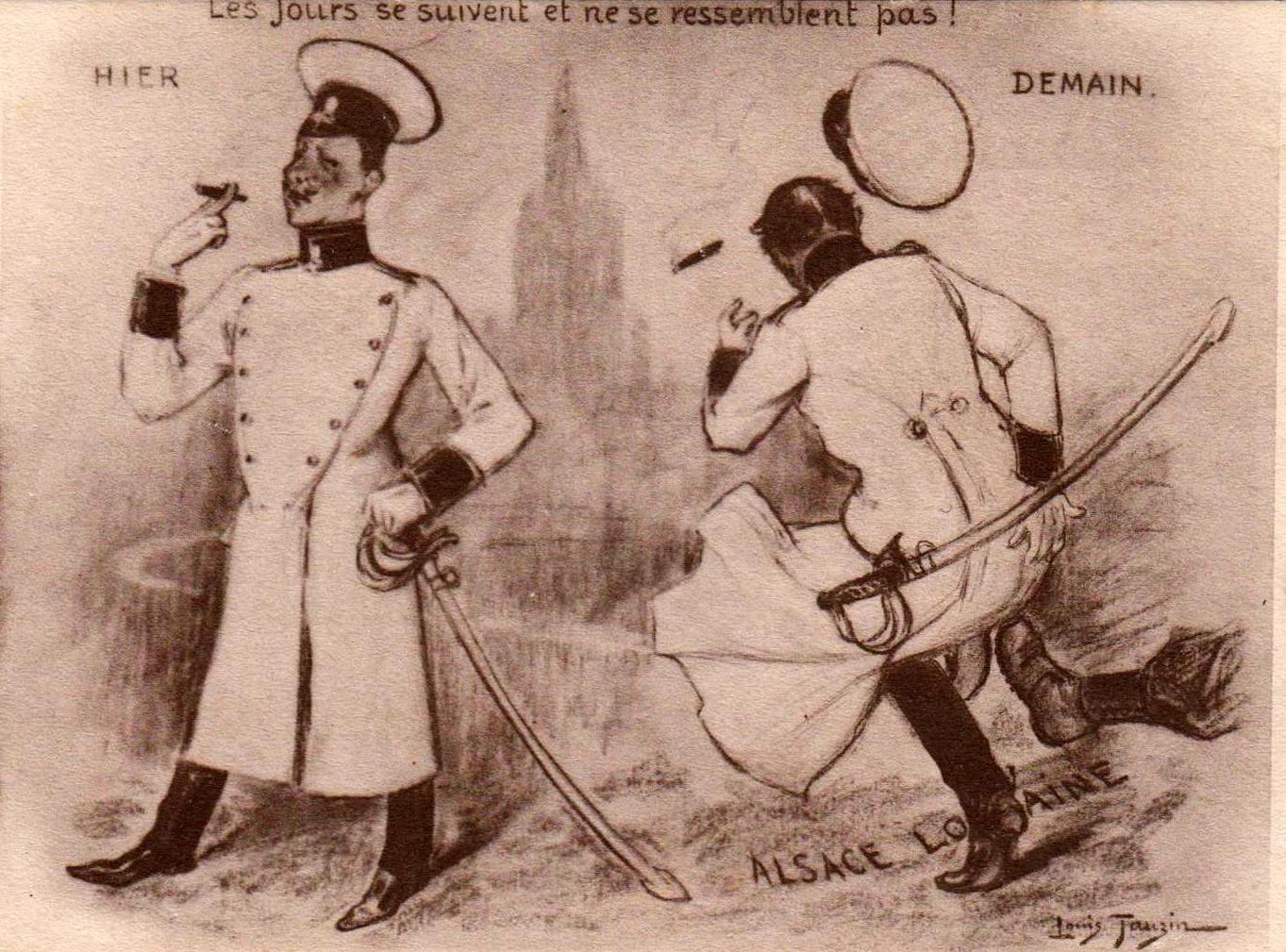

== Tauzin in museums ==
Works by Tauzin (paintings unless otherwise noted) are held in these collections in France:

Barbezieux-Saint-Hilaire, Musée Gétaud (at the Château de Barbezieux)

- La forêt de Meudon

Bordeaux, Musée des beaux-arts

- Paris en 1889, vue prise depuis la terrasse de Meudon (1889)

Chambery, Musée des beaux-arts

- Femme et enfant dans la forêt (ca. 1890)

Dieppe, Château de Dieppe

- Fécamp (poster, ca. 1905)

Meudon, Musée d'art et d'histoire de Meudon

- L’avenue du château (1890)
- Blanchisseuses (ca. 1890)
- Violoneux au Bas-Meudon (ca. 1890)
- L'ancienne verrerie de Meudon (ca. 1902)
- Bateau-lavoir au Bas-Meudon (1910)
- L’étang de Trivaux
- L'île Seguin vue de Meudon
- Sentier du bois de Meudon sous la neige

Paris, Musée du Louvre

- Vue de Paris depuis la terrasse de Meudon (drawing, 1890)

Paris, Musée national de la Marine

- Mitrailleuse, canonnière type Farcy, devant Tuyen Quan, 1886
- Revolver, canonnière type Farcy, au rapide de Yuoc, 1886

Paris, Bibliothèque nationale de France

- 26 posters by Tauzin are conserved at the National Library of France

== Tauzin at auction ==
A 21st-century record for a work by Tauzin was set by a 41 x 29-inch lithographic poster, Les Vosges (made for Chemins de fer de l'est in 1913), auctioned at Christie's London in 2004 for 8,963 GBP (US$16,483).

== Sources ==
- Guillin, Anne and Blin, Sylvie. Les Peintres et les Hauts-de-Seine, Sogemo, 1991.
- Villadier, Francis, editor. Les Peintres de la «belle boucle» de la Seine: 1800-1930 (exhibition catalogue), Issy-les-Moulineaux/Meudon: Ville d'Issy-les-Moulineau, 2015; pp. 20, 65, 67, 96, 97.
