= Szkoła Narodowa Polska w Paryżu =

Polish international school at the Polish embassy in France

Coordinates: 48.8865°N 2.3194°E

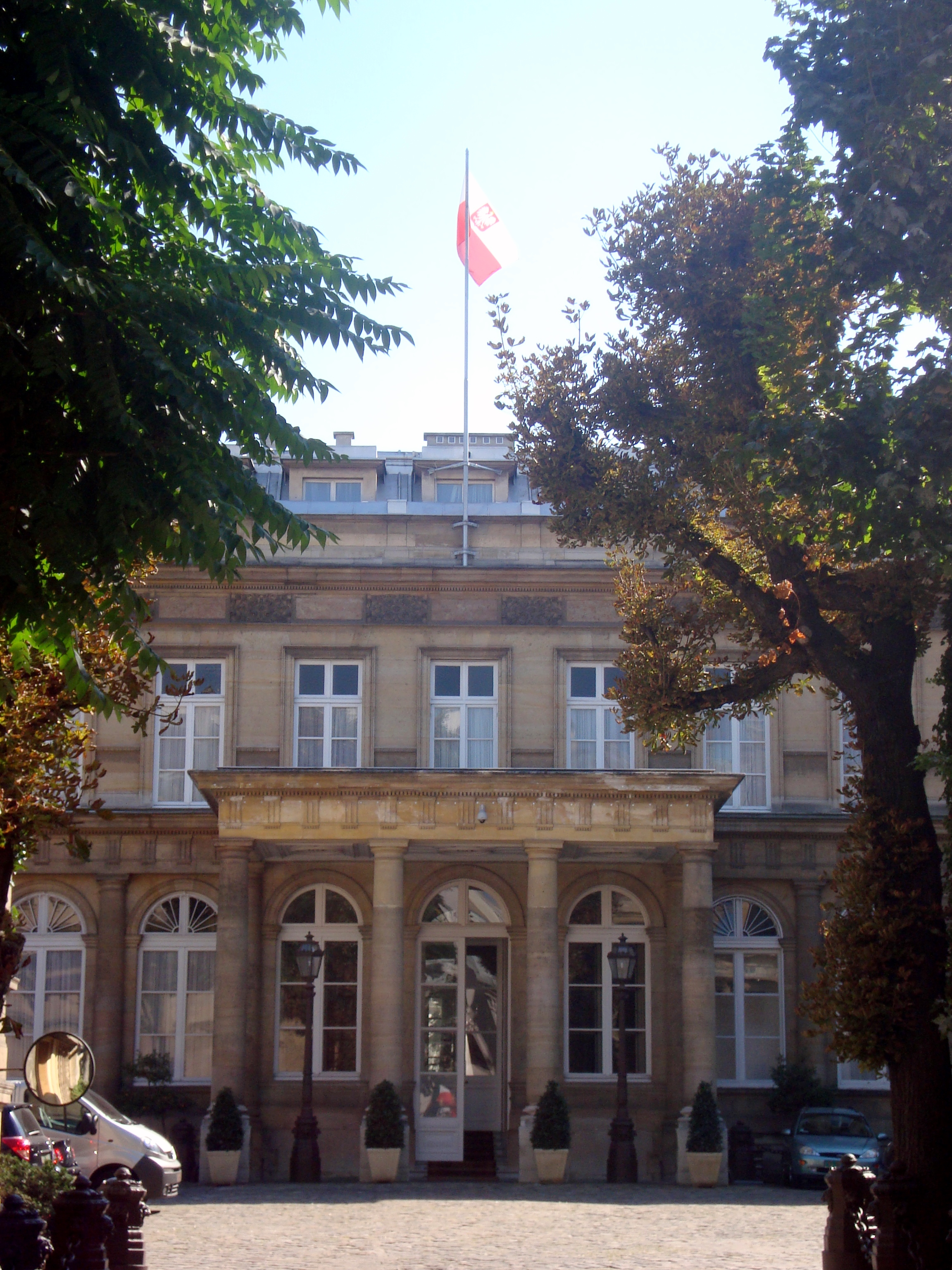
Polish Embassy in Paris (Szkoła Narodowa Polska w Paryżu)

Szkoła Narodowa Polska w Paryżu ("Polish School in Paris"), also known as the School at Batignolles (French: École polonaise des Batignolles, pronounced [ekɔl pɔlɔnɛz de batiɲɔl]) is a Polish international school at the Polish embassy in the 17th arrondissement of Paris, France.

It includes a primary school and a three-year lyceum course followed by a further three years of (senior high school/sixth form college) under the aegis of the Polish Ministry of Education.

The history of the schools dates to mid-19th century, and it is seen as an important element of Polish-French culture, particularly for the Polish people in France.

== History ==
The school first opened in Chatillon-sous-Bagneux in October 1842, and moved to Paris in 1843.

== Part-time school ==
It has Wednesday and Saturday part-time classes, and its instruction includes Polish history, the Polish language, and Polish geography. Students may get extra marks in the French Baccalaureate for completing these classes. The school's role in giving access to Polish culture and the Polish language, makes it a popular school among Polish parents in the Paris area.

== Location ==
Ewelina Dabaene, the author of "Emigration Versus Mobility. The Case of the Polish Community in France and Ireland," wrote that Polish families living in outlying parts of the Paris area may find that this school, located in central Paris, is "not an easy reach".
