= Louis-Eugène Tauzin =

French sculptor

- Born: 12 August 1882; Meudon, France
- Education: Pupil of Jules Coutan at the École des Beaux-Arts in Paris
- Occupation: Sculptor
- Father: Louis Tauzin

Louis-Eugène Tauzin (born 12 August 1882, date of death unknown) was a French sculptor. He was the son of the French artist and lithographer Louis Tauzin (1842–1915). His work was exhibited at the Paris Salon in 1907, 1909, 1910 (a portrait bust of his father), and 1912.

His work was included in the sculpture event in the art competition at the 1924 Summer Olympics.

== Works ==
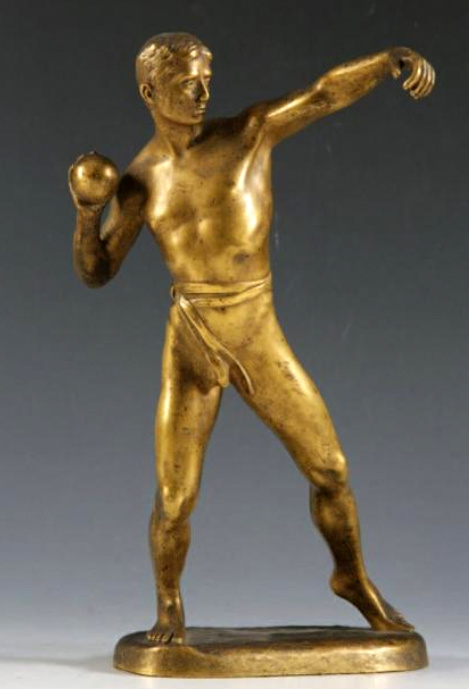
Le lanceur de poids (Shot-putter), 1912.

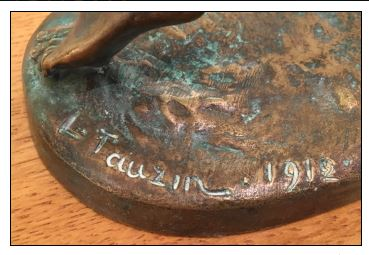
Le lanceur de poids: signature with date.
