= Jules Coutan =

French sculptor and educator (1848–1939)

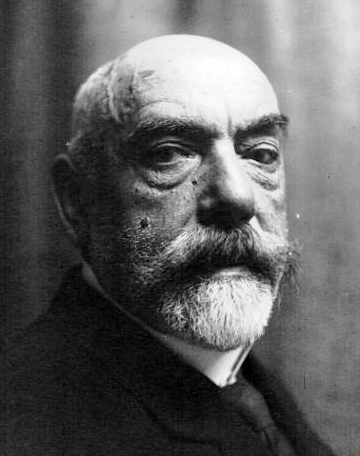
- Coutan in 1923
- Born: 22 September 1848; Paris
- Died: 23 February 1939 (aged 90); Paris
- Known for: sculpture
- Awards: Prix de Rome

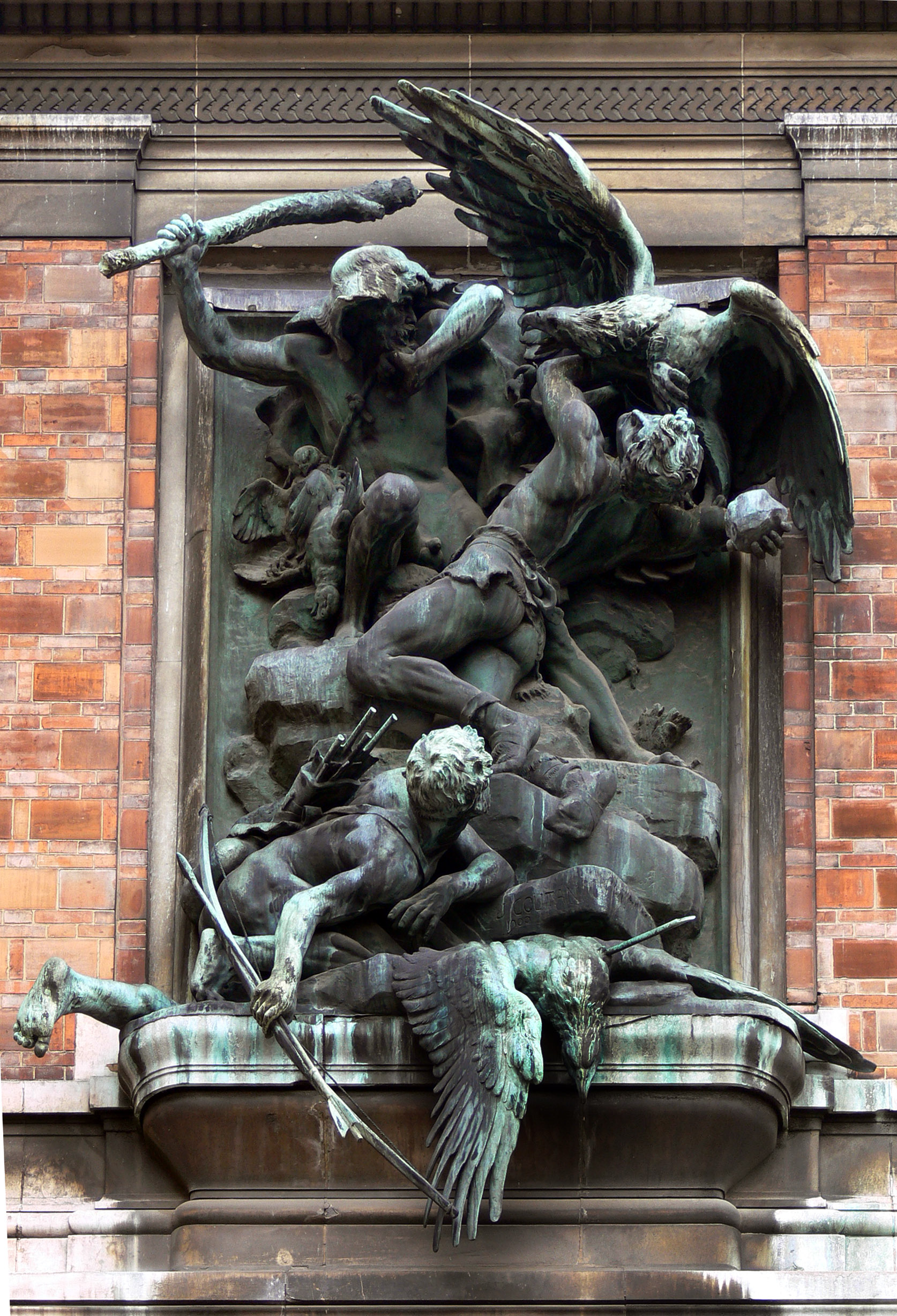
The Eagle Hunters for the facade of the Museum of Natural History, Paris

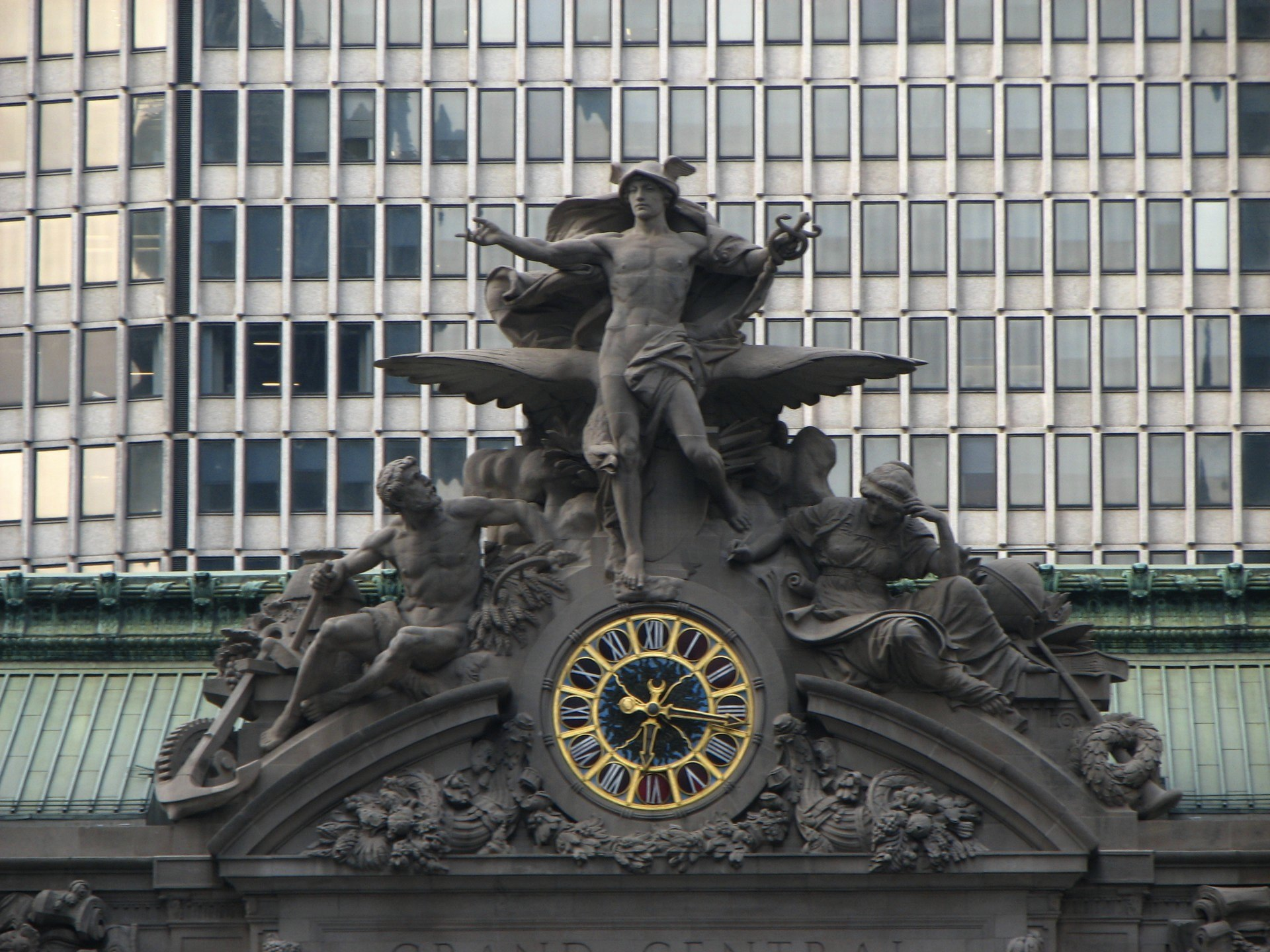
Glory of Commerce, Grand Central Terminal, 1911-14 (depicting Hercules, Mercury, and Minerva)

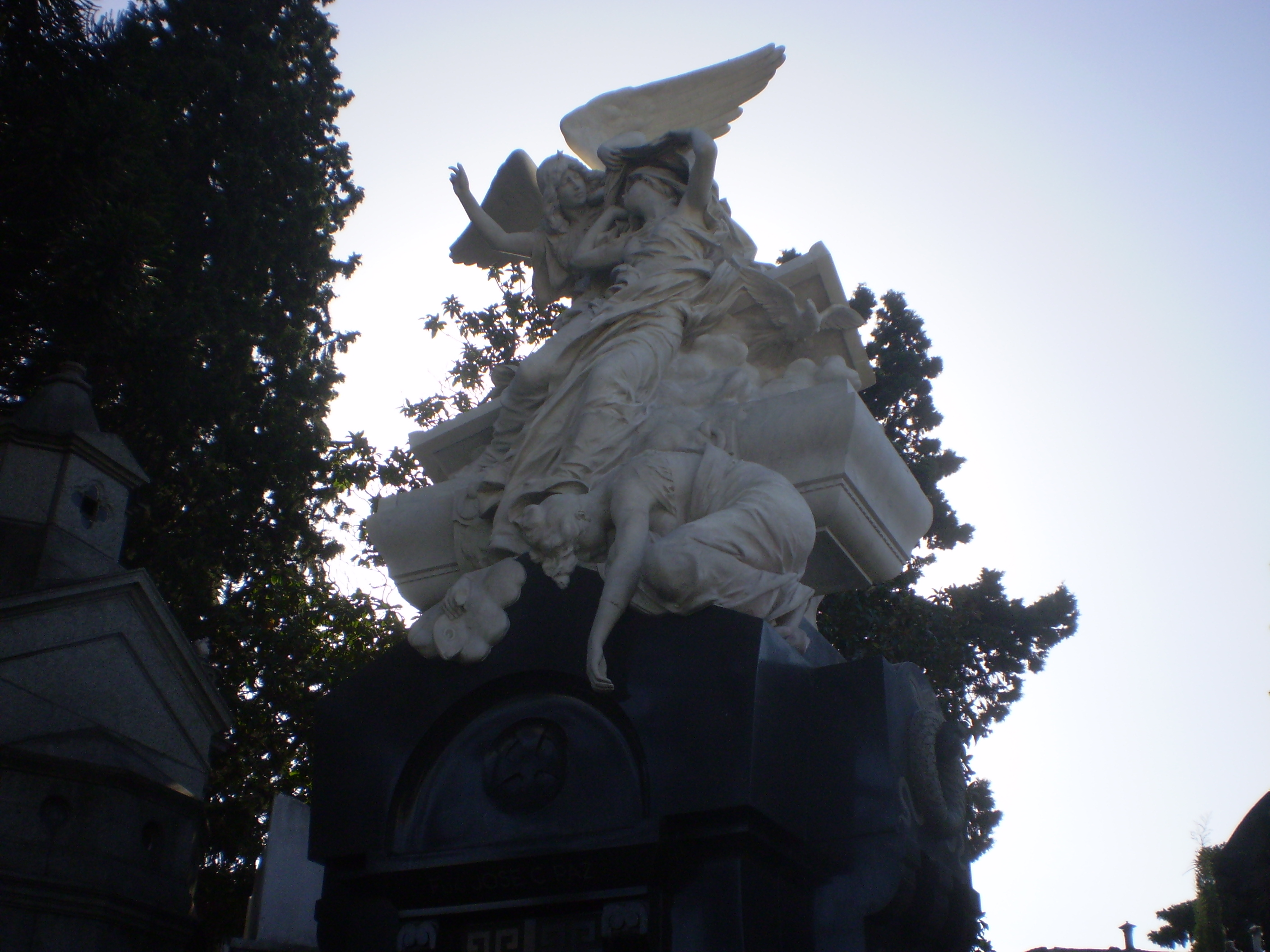
Jose C. Paz tomb, La Recoleta Cemetery, Buenos Aires, Argentina

Jules-Félix Coutan (French pronunciation: [ʒyl feliks kutɑ̃]; 22 September 1848 – 23 February 1939) was a French sculptor and educator.

== Life ==
As a student at the École des Beaux-Arts, Coutan was awarded the Prix de Rome in 1872; after his return to Paris he executed the fountain group France Bearing the Torch of Civilization for the Exposition Universelle (1889), one of the two prominent sculptural commissions for the exposition grounds. Later he taught at the École des Beaux-Arts from 1900, where he expressed his disdain for the researches of Rodin (as fumiste) and the Impressionist sculptors who followed him. He was elected to the Académie des Beaux-Arts in 1905.

Coutan is best known in the United States for the sculptural group above the entrance to Grand Central Terminal in New York City. For Grand Central Terminal, Coutan was contracted to provide a quarter-size scale plaster model of the three-figure allegorical Transportation group, which he developed from 1911 through 1914. (Coutan never visited the U.S.) The carving was performed by the William Bradley & Son of Long Island City.

The small bronzes, some stamped by the founders Thiebaut Frères, that represented a constant source of income for Coutan and a genre typical of his output, appear with some frequency on the art market.

Among Coutan's students were Hippolyte Lefèbvre, Raymond Delamarre, Louis-Eugène Tauzin, Henri Proszynski and the Argentine sculptor Rogelio Yrurtia.

== Work ==
- fountain group France Bearing the Torch of Civilization for the Exposition Universelle (1889)
- caryatids for the Opéra-Comique, Paris, 1899
- reliefs Science and Labor for the Pont de Passy (now the Pont de Bir-Hakeim), Paris
- bas-reliefs for the polychrome terra-cotta facade in the Square Félix-Desruelles, with architect Charles Risler, for Sèvres Porcelain, circa 1900
- figure of La France de la Renaissance for the Pont Alexandre III, circa 1900
- high relief, The Eagle Hunters for the facade of the Muséum national d'histoire naturelle in Paris; also the plaster model at the Musée d'Orsay (1893–1900); bronze cast (1900), installed
- Glory of Commerce group for Grand Central Terminal, NYC, 1914
- the bust of Georges-Eugène Haussmann at the Père Lachaise Cemetery
- Franco-Prussian War Memorial, Poitiers
- angel figures for the José C. Paz tomb, La Recoleta Cemetery, Buenos Aires, Argentina
- monument of Carlos Pellegrini Buenos Aires, Argentina
